= T. W. Alley =

American football player and coach (1942–1993)

Biographical details
- Born: July 27, 1942; Wytheville, Virginia, U.S.
- Died: February 5, 1993 (aged 50); Rock Hill, South Carolina, U.S.

Playing career
- 1963–1964: William & Mary
- 1964–1965: Richmond Rebels
- Positions: Tackle, defensive lineman

Coaching career (HC unless noted)
- 1966: Princess Anne HS (VA) (assistant)
- 1967–1968: Randolph–Macon (line)
- 1969–1972: Louisville (OL)
- 1973–1974: Louisville

Head coaching record
- Overall: 9–13

Accomplishments and honors

Awards
- All-Southern Conference (1964)

Thomas Walter Alley (July 27, 1942 – February 5, 1993) was an American football player and coach. Alley was an All-Southern Conference tackle and 1964 graduate of The College of William and Mary. He held an M.Ed. from William and Mary, was drafted by the Pittsburgh Steelers and Boston Patriots, and played for two years with the Richmond Rebels of the Atlantic Coast Football League (ACFL) and Continental Football League (COFL) before joining the coaching staff at Princess Anne High School in Virginia Beach, Virginia.

In 1967 Alley became the line coach at Randolph–Macon College in Ashland, Virginia. In his first season, 1967, the Yellow Jackets finished 7–2 and won the Mason–Dixon Conference and Virginia Small College League (VSCL) championships. In his second and final season, 1968, Randolph–Macon achieved the school's only undefeated, untied season, since the football program's inaugural campaign in 1881, and repeated as Mason–Dixon and VSCL champions.

After serving as an assistant for three seasons, Alley was named as the head coach at the University of Louisville for the 1973 season, succeeding Lee Corso. Alley's 1973 Cardinals team was 5–6 in his first year (3–2 in the Missouri Valley Conference (MVC). The team ended the year with a two-game winning streak, posting victories against Furman (35–14) and West Texas State (21–9).

Alley's 1974 Louisville team finished 4–7 (3–2 in the MVC). The team opened the season with three losses, to Memphis State (16–10), Auburn (16–3) and Cincinnati (7–6). The Cardinals won their first two conference games, against Wichita State (14–7) and North Texas State (24–10), before losing to Drake (38–35), Mississippi State (56–7) and the Tulsa (37–7). After a win against Dayton (20–15), Louisville lost to Vanderbilt (44–0) before closing with a victory against West Texas State (10–8). Alley was fired after two seasons and replaced as Louisville's head coach by Vince Gibson.

Alley died of an apparent heart attack, on February 5, 1993, at a hospital in Rock Hill, South Carolina.

== Head coaching record ==
Year	Team	Overall	Conference	Standing	Bowl/playoffs
Louisville Cardinals (Missouri Valley Conference) (1973–1974)
1973	Louisville	5–6	3–2	T–3rd	
1974	Louisville	4–7	3–2	2nd	
Louisville:		9–13	6–4		
Total:		73–85–6			
