= 1974 Penn State Nittany Lions football team =

American college football season

1974 Penn State Nittany Lions football

Eastern champion Cotton Bowl champion

Cotton Bowl Classic, W 41–20 vs. Baylor
- Conference: Independent

Ranking
- Coaches: No. 7
- AP: No. 7
- Record: 10–2
- Head coach: Joe Paterno (9th season)
- Offensive scheme: I formation
- Defensive coordinator: Jim O'Hora (9th season)
- Base defense: 4–3
- Captains: Jack Baiorunos; Jim Bradley
- Home stadium: Beaver Stadium

1974 NCAA Division I independents football records
	Conf.			Overall
Team	W	L	T	W		L		T
No. 6 Notre Dame		–		10	–	2	–	0
No. 7 Penn State		–		10	–	2	–	0
Temple		–		8	–	2	–	0
Boston College		–		8	–	3	–	0
Utah State		–		8	–	3	–	0
No. 19 Houston		–		8	–	3	–	1
Rutgers		–		7	–	3	–	1
Cincinnati		–		7	–	4	–	0
Memphis State		–		7	–	4	–	0
Pittsburgh		–		7	–	4	–	0
Georgia Tech		–		6	–	5	–	0
Hawaii		–		6	–	5	–	0
Miami (FL)		–		6	–	5	–	0
Southern Miss		–		6	–	5	–	0
Tampa		–		6	–	5	–	0
Holy Cross		–		5	–	5	–	1
Tulane		–		5	–	6	–	0
Colgate		–		4	–	6	–	0
Northern Illinois		–		4	–	7	–	0
Navy		–		4	–	7	–	0
South Carolina		–		4	–	7	–	0
Virginia Tech		–		4	–	7	–	0
West Virginia		–		4	–	7	–	0
Army		–		3	–	8	–	0
Dayton		–		3	–	8	–	0
Villanova		–		3	–	8	–	0
Air Force		–		2	–	9	–	0
Southern Illinois		–		2	–	9	–	0
Syracuse		–		2	–	9	–	0
Florida State		–		1	–	10	–	0
Marshall		–		1	–	10	–	0
Rankings from AP Poll

The 1974 Penn State Nittany Lions football team represented Pennsylvania State University as an independent during the 1974 NCAA Division I football season. Led by ninth-year head coach Joe Paterno, the Nittany Lions compiled a record of 10–2 with a win over Baylor in the Cotton Bowl Classic. Penn State played home games at Beaver Stadium in University Park, Pennsylvania.

== Schedule ==
Date	Opponent	Rank	Site	TV	Result	Attendance	Source
September 14	No. 20 Stanford	No. 8	Beaver Stadium; University Park, PA	ABC	W 24–20	58,200	
September 21	Navy	No. 8	Beaver Stadium; University Park, PA		L 6–7	42,000	
September 28	at Iowa	No. 19	Kinnick Stadium; Iowa City, IA		W 27–0	46,500	
October 5	at Army	No. 15	Michie Stadium; West Point, NY		W 21–14	41,221	
October 12	Wake Forest^{†}	No. 15	Beaver Stadium; University Park, PA		W 55–0	56,500	
October 19	Syracuse	No. 11	Beaver Stadium; University Park, PA (rivalry)		W 30–14	59,100	
October 26	at West Virginia	No. 10	Mountaineer Field; Morgantown, WV (rivalry)		W 21–12	34,500	
November 2	No. 15 Maryland	No. 10	Beaver Stadium; University Park, PA (rivalry)	ABC	W 24–17	60,125	
November 9	at NC State	No. 7	Carter Stadium; Raleigh, NC		L 7–12	47,700	
November 16	Ohio	No. 11	Beaver Stadium; University Park, PA		W 35–16	58,700	
November 28	at No. 18 Pittsburgh	No. 10	Three Rivers Stadium; Pittsburgh, PA (rivalry)	ABC	W 31–10	48,895	
January 1, 1975	vs. No. 12 Baylor	No. 7	Cotton Bowl; Dallas, TX (Cotton Bowl Classic)	CBS	W 41–20	67,500–68,500	
^{†}Homecoming; Rankings from AP Poll released prior to the game

== Roster ==
1974 Penn State Nittany Lions football team roster
Players
Coaches
Offense

Pos.	#	Name	Class
QB	18	John Andress	So
QB	16	Dick Barvinchak	Jr
OT	71	Brad Benson	So
OT	74	Jeff Bleamer	Sr
G	65	Ron Coder	So
RB	32	Tom Donchez	Sr
G	61	John Nessel	Sr
G	72	Tom Rafferty	Jr
QB	12	Tom Shuman	Sr

Defense

Pos.	#	Name	Class
LB	53	Kurt Allerman	So
LB	67	Greg Buttle	Jr
LB	66	Chris Devlin	Sr
DE	85	Dave Graf	Sr
DE	79	Mike Hartenstine	Sr
LB	33	James Rosecrans	Jr

Special teams

Pos.	#	Name	Class
K	99	Chris Bahr	Jr

Head coach

- Joe Paterno

Coordinators/assistant coaches

- Dick Anderson
- Booker Brooks
- John Chuckran
- Gregg Ducatte
- Fran Ganter
- Jim O'Hora
- Bob Phillips
- Jerry Sandusky
- J. T. White

Legend

- (C) Team captain
- (S) Suspended
- (I) Ineligible
- Injured
- Redshirt

Roster

== NFL draft ==
Ten Nittany Lions were drafted in the 1975 NFL draft.

Round	Pick	Overall	Name	Position	Team
2nd	5	31	Mike Hartenstine	Defensive end	Chicago Bears
4th	3	81	John Nessel	Offensive guard	Atlanta Falcons
4th	24	102	Tom Donchez	Running back	Buffalo Bills
6th	12	142	Tom Shuman	Quarterback	Cincinnati Bengals
7th	14	170	Chris Devlin	Linebacker	Cincinnati Bengals
8th	16	198	Jeff Bleamer	Offensive tackle	Philadelphia Eagles
9th	15	223	Dan Natale	Tight end	San Francisco 49ers
10th	22	256	Joe Jackson	Linebacker	Miami Dolphins
12th	16	312	Greg Murphy	Defensive end	Pittsburgh Steelers
17th	5	421	Dave Graf	Linebacker	Cleveland Browns
