= 1974 Astro-Bluebonnet Bowl =

NC State Wolfpack	Houston Cougars
(9–2)	(8–3)
31	31
Head coach: Lou Holtz	Head coach: Bill Yeoman
AP / Coaches; 13 / 9
	1	2	3	4	Total
NC State	3	7	7	14	31
Houston	0	3	7	21	31
- Date: December 23, 1974
- Season: 1974
- Stadium: Houston Astrodome
- Location: Houston, Texas
- Attendance: 35,122

United States TV coverage
- Network: ABC
- Announcers: Chris Schenkel and Darrell Royal

The 1974 Astro-Bluebonnet Bowl was an American college football bowl game that was played on December 23, 1974 at the Astrodome in Houston, Texas. It was the sixteenth edition of the Bluebonnet Bowl. The game matched the Houston Cougars against the NC State Wolfpack. It was the final contest of the 1974 NCAA Division I football season for both teams. The game ended in a 31–31 tie.

== Teams ==
The game matched the Houston Cougars against the NC State Wolfpack of the Atlantic Coast Conference. The game was the first bowl game featuring the Cougars and the Wolfpack, and was their third overall meeting. The two teams had met twice before, with each team winning one against the other, and the teams' previous meeting was in 1969, when the Cougars defeated the Wolfpack 34–13.

=== NC State Wolfpack ===
The NC State Wolfpack of the ACC entered the game ranked 13 in the AP Poll. During the regular season, they had compiled a 9–2 record, including a 4–2 record against conference opponents; they placed second in their conference standings. The game represented the Wolfpack's first appearance in the Bluebonnet Bowl.

=== Houston Cougars ===
The conference-independent Cougars entered the game unranked in the AP Poll. Their regular-season record was 8–3. The game represented the Cougars' fourth appearance in the Bluebonnet Bowl; their previous appearance was in the 1973 Astro-Bluebonnet Bowl, in which they defeated the Tulane Green Wave 47–7.

== Game summary ==
=== Scoring summary ===
Scoring summary

Quarter	Time	Drive			Team	Scoring information	Score	
Quarter	Time	Plays	Yards	TOP	Team	Scoring information	NCSU	HOU
1					NCSU	37-yard field goal by John Huff	3	0
2					HOU	21-yard field goal by Lennard Coplin	3	3
2					NCSU	Roland Hooks 11-yard touchdown run, Huff kick good	10	3
3					HOU	John Housman 1-yard touchdown run, Coplin kick good	10	10
3					NCSU	Stan Fritts 7-yard touchdown reception from Dave Buckey, Huff kick good	17	10
4					HOU	Marshall Johnson 10-yard touchdown run, Coplin kick good	17	17
4					HOU	Eddie Foster 73-yard touchdown reception from Bubba McGallion, Coplin kick good	17	24
4					HOU	Housman 5-yard touchdown run, Coplin kick good	17	31
4					NCSU	Tommy London 9-yard touchdown run, 2-point pass failed	23	31
4					NCSU	Dave Buckey 1-yard touchdown run, 2-point run good	31	31
"TOP" = time of possession. For other American football terms, see Glossary of American football.							31	31

=== Statistics ===
Statistics	NCSU	HOU
First downs	20	25
Plays–yards	71–354	83–524
Rushes–yards	41–154	69–345
Passing yards	200	179
Passing: Comp–Att–Int	18–30–2	8–14–2
