= 1974 Virginia Tech Gobblers football team =

American college football season

1974 Virginia Tech Gobblers football
- Conference: Independent
- Record: 4–7
- Head coach: Jimmy Sharpe (1st season)
- Offensive coordinator: Dan Henning (2nd season)
- Defensive coordinator: Charley Pell (1st season)
- Home stadium: Lane Stadium

1974 NCAA Division I independents football records
	Conf.			Overall
Team	W	L	T	W		L		T
No. 6 Notre Dame		–		10	–	2	–	0
No. 7 Penn State		–		10	–	2	–	0
Temple		–		8	–	2	–	0
Boston College		–		8	–	3	–	0
Utah State		–		8	–	3	–	0
No. 19 Houston		–		8	–	3	–	1
Rutgers		–		7	–	3	–	1
Cincinnati		–		7	–	4	–	0
Memphis State		–		7	–	4	–	0
Pittsburgh		–		7	–	4	–	0
Georgia Tech		–		6	–	5	–	0
Hawaii		–		6	–	5	–	0
Miami (FL)		–		6	–	5	–	0
Southern Miss		–		6	–	5	–	0
Tampa		–		6	–	5	–	0
Holy Cross		–		5	–	5	–	1
Tulane		–		5	–	6	–	0
Colgate		–		4	–	6	–	0
Northern Illinois		–		4	–	7	–	0
Navy		–		4	–	7	–	0
South Carolina		–		4	–	7	–	0
Virginia Tech		–		4	–	7	–	0
West Virginia		–		4	–	7	–	0
Army		–		3	–	8	–	0
Dayton		–		3	–	8	–	0
Villanova		–		3	–	8	–	0
Air Force		–		2	–	9	–	0
Southern Illinois		–		2	–	9	–	0
Syracuse		–		2	–	9	–	0
Florida State		–		1	–	10	–	0
Marshall		–		1	–	10	–	0
Rankings from AP Poll

The 1974 Virginia Tech Gobblers football team was an American football team that represented Virginia Tech as an independent during the 1974 NCAA Division I football season. In their first year under head coach Jimmy Sharpe, the Gobblers compiled an overall record of 4–7.

== Schedule ==
Date	Opponent	Site	Result	Attendance	Source
September 14	Kentucky	Lane Stadium; Blacksburg, VA	L 7–38	23,000	
September 21	at SMU	Cotton Bowl; Dallas, TX	L 25–28	13,767	
September 28	Houston	Lane Stadium; Blacksburg, VA	L 12–49	30,000	
October 5	vs. VMI	City Stadium; Richmond, VA (Tobacco Bowl, rivalry)	L 17–22	22,000	
October 12	at South Carolina	Williams–Brice Stadium; Columbia, SC	W 31–17	35,897	
October 19	at Virginia	Scott Stadium; Charlottesville, VA (rivalry)	L 27–28	32,149	
October 26	Richmond^{†}	Lane Stadium; Blacksburg, VA	W 41–7	40,000	
November 1	at Miami (FL)	Miami Orange Bowl; Miami, Fl (rivalry)	L 7–14	20,134	
November 9	at William & Mary	Cary Field; Williamsburg, VA	W 34–15	15,000	
November 16	at Florida State	Doak Campbell Stadium; Tallahassee, FL	W 56–21	27,707	
November 23	West Virginia	Lane Stadium; Blacksburg, VA (rivalry)	L 21–22	36,000	
^{†}Homecoming

== Roster ==
The following players were members of the 1974 football team.

1974 Virginia Tech Gobblers football team roster
Players
Coaches
Offense

Pos.	#	Name	Class
FB		Paul Adams
OL		Mike Arbaugh
QB	13	Bruce Arians	Sr
QB		Mitcheal Barnes
C		Greg Birtsch
RB		Morris Blueford
WR		Henry Bradley
OL		Mike Brammer
C	55	Blair Buskirk	So
C, G		Larry Capps
OL		Allen Cure
OL		Rondal Davis
TE		Kevin Dick
OL		Keith Gibson
RB		George Heath
FB		Dickie Holway
FB		Tony Houff
RB		Billy King
OT		Barry Miller
QB	14	Greg Mullinax	Jr
TE	83	Jay Neal	Jr
RB		Chuck Nuttycombe
OL	65	Danny Patterson	So
OL		Steve Philbrick
RB		Nick Rapone
RB	40	Phil Rogers	Jr
OL	75	Don Rudzinski	So
WR		Ricky Scales
QB		Eddie Snell
FB		Greg Toal
C		Randy Vey
C		Bill Wallace

Defense

Pos.	#	Name	Class
DL		Larry Bearekman
DL	77	Tom Beasley	So
DB		John Bell
DL		Brent Bledsoe
DL		Robert Blue
DE		Larry Blunt
LB		Rickey Bush
DB		Roscoe Coles	Fr
DB		Tom Cooper
DE		Skip Creasey
DB		Ron Davis
DB		Moses Foster
DB	43	Barry Garber	Sr
DB	88	Billy Hardee	Jr
DB		Rick Harman
DB		Jerry Inge
DE		Ken Lambert
LB		Curt Lowery
DE		Luke Marsengill
DL		Charley Martin
DE		Keith McCarter
DB		Lynn McCoy	Sr
DL		Stuart Patterson	So
DB		Greg Payne
DB	22	Chuck Perdue	Jr
LB	38	Rick Razzano	Fr
LB		Bill Schrews
DL		Andre Tennessee	Jr
LB	53	Doug Thacker	Jr
DL		Tom Turner	Jr
LB	66	David Wood	Jr

Special teams

Pos.	#	Name	Class
K		Wayne Latimer
P		Bruce McDaniel

Head coach

- Frank Beamer

Coordinators/assistant coaches

Legend

- (C) Team captain
- (S) Suspended
- (I) Ineligible
- Injured
- Redshirt
