= 1974 Georgia Tech Yellow Jackets football team =

American college football season

1974 Georgia Tech Yellow Jackets football
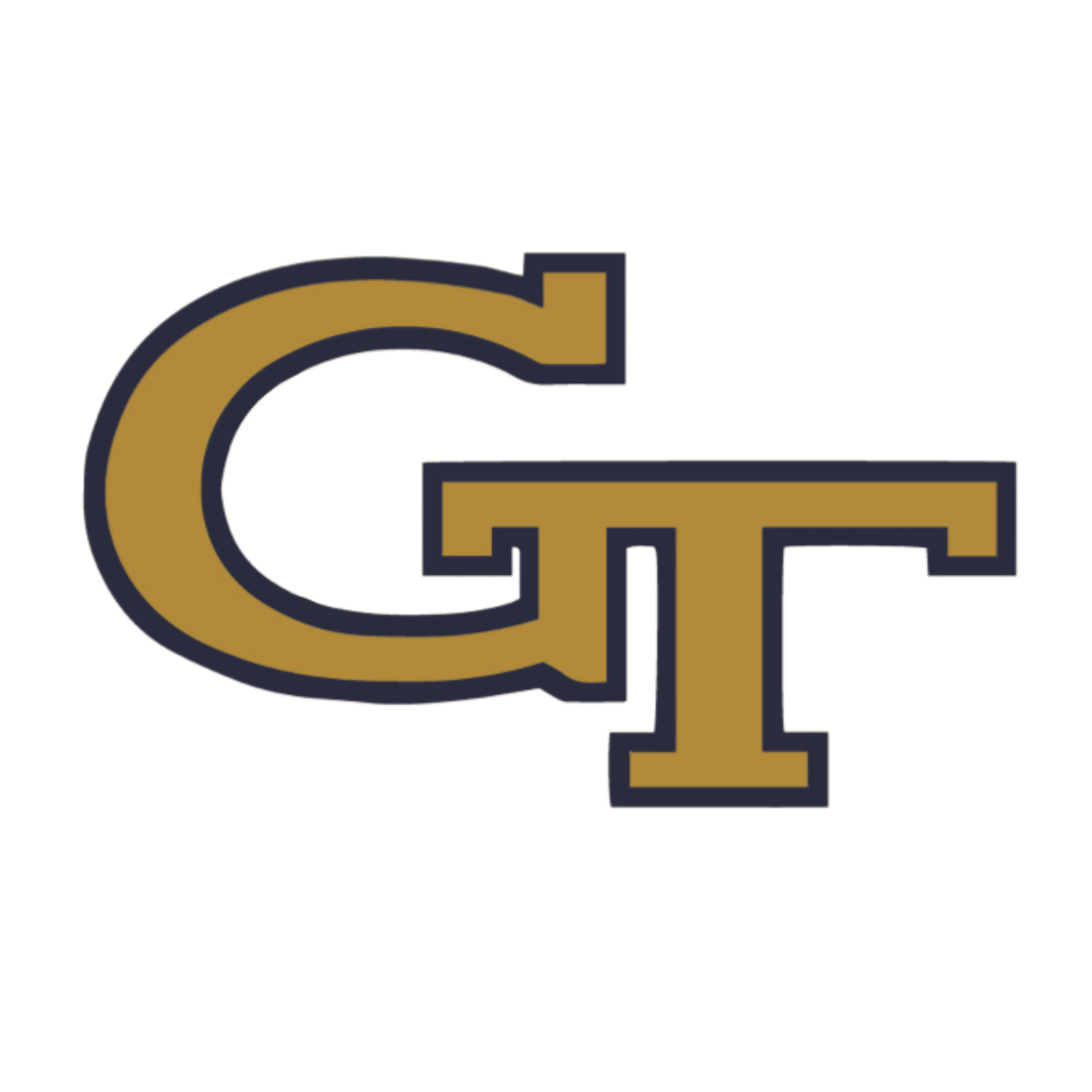
- Conference: Independent
- Record: 6–5
- Head coach: Pepper Rodgers (1st season)
- Captains: Billy Shields; Joe Harris; Randy Rhino
- Home stadium: Grant Field

1974 NCAA Division I independents football records
	Conf.			Overall
Team	W	L	T	W		L		T
No. 6 Notre Dame		–		10	–	2	–	0
No. 7 Penn State		–		10	–	2	–	0
Temple		–		8	–	2	–	0
Boston College		–		8	–	3	–	0
Utah State		–		8	–	3	–	0
No. 19 Houston		–		8	–	3	–	1
Rutgers		–		7	–	3	–	1
Cincinnati		–		7	–	4	–	0
Memphis State		–		7	–	4	–	0
Pittsburgh		–		7	–	4	–	0
Georgia Tech		–		6	–	5	–	0
Hawaii		–		6	–	5	–	0
Miami (FL)		–		6	–	5	–	0
Southern Miss		–		6	–	5	–	0
Tampa		–		6	–	5	–	0
Holy Cross		–		5	–	5	–	1
Tulane		–		5	–	6	–	0
Colgate		–		4	–	6	–	0
Northern Illinois		–		4	–	7	–	0
Navy		–		4	–	7	–	0
South Carolina		–		4	–	7	–	0
Virginia Tech		–		4	–	7	–	0
West Virginia		–		4	–	7	–	0
Army		–		3	–	8	–	0
Dayton		–		3	–	8	–	0
Villanova		–		3	–	8	–	0
Air Force		–		2	–	9	–	0
Southern Illinois		–		2	–	9	–	0
Syracuse		–		2	–	9	–	0
Florida State		–		1	–	10	–	0
Marshall		–		1	–	10	–	0
Rankings from AP Poll

The 1974 Georgia Tech Yellow Jackets football team represented the Georgia Institute of Technology as an independent during the 1974 NCAA Division I football season. The Yellow Jackets were led by first-year head coach Pepper Rodgers, and played their home games at Grant Field in Atlanta.

== Schedule ==
Date	Opponent	Site	TV	Result	Attendance	Source
September 9	No. 3 Notre Dame	Grant Field; Atlanta, GA (rivalry)	ABC	L 7–31	44,228	
September 14	South Carolina	Grant Field; Atlanta, GA		W 35–20	47,171	
September 21	No. 15 Pittsburgh	Grant Field; Atlanta, GA		L 17–27	37,361	
September 28	at Clemson	Memorial Stadium; Clemson, SC (rivalry)		L 17–21	40,275	
October 5	Virginia	Grant Field; Atlanta, GA		W 28–24	26,371	
October 12	North Carolina^{†}	Grant Field; Atlanta, GA		W 29–28	38,413	
October 19	at No. 5 Auburn	Jordan-Hare Stadium; Auburn, AL (rivalry)		L 22–31	62,907	
October 26	No. 18 Tulane	Grant Field; Atlanta, GA	ABC	W 27–7	48,623	
November 2	at Duke	Wallace Wade Stadium; Durham, NC		L 0–9	34,500	
November 16	Navy	Grant Field; Atlanta, GA		W 22–0	41,132	
November 30	at Georgia	Sanford Stadium; Athens, GA (Clean, Old-Fashioned Hate)		W 34–14	47,500	
^{†}Homecoming; Rankings from AP Poll released prior to the game
