= 1974 Long Beach State 49ers football team =

American college football season

1974 Long Beach State 49ers football
- Conference: Pacific Coast Athletic Association
- Record: 6–5 (1–3 PCAA)
- Head coach: Wayne Howard (1st season)
- Offensive coordinator: Ron McBride (1st season)
- Defensive coordinator: Tom Gadd (1st season)
- Home stadium: Veterans Stadium

1974 Pacific Coast Athletic Association football standings
	Conf.					Overall
Team	W		L		T	W		L		T
San Diego State $	4	–	0	–	0	8	–	2	–	1
San Jose State	2	–	2	–	0	8	–	3	–	1
Pacific (CA)	2	–	2	–	0	6	–	5	–	0
Long Beach State	1	–	3	–	0	6	–	5	–	0
Fresno State	1	–	3	–	0	5	–	7	–	0
Cal State Fullerton	0	–	0	–	0	4	–	6	–	0
$ – Conference champion

The 1974 Long Beach State 49ers football team represented California State University, Long Beach (Note: The official name of Long Beach State has been California State University, Long Beach since 1972. However, it is still commonly known as Long Beach State.) during the 1974 NCAA Division I football season.

Cal State Long Beach competed in the Pacific Coast Athletic Association. (Note: The Big West Conference was known as the Pacific Coast Athletic Association from its founding in 1969 through 1987.) The team was led by first year head coach Wayne Howard, and played the majority of their home games at Veterans Stadium adjacent to the campus of Long Beach City College in Long Beach, California. In addition, they played one home game at Anaheim Stadium in Anaheim, California. They finished the season with a record of six wins, five losses (6–5, 1–3 PCAA).

== Schedule ==
Date	Opponent	Site	Result	Attendance	Source
September 14	at Northern Illinois*	Huskie Stadium; DeKalb, IL	L 14–16	8,428	
September 21	at Pacific (CA)	Pacific Memorial Stadium; Stockton, CA	L 6–38	13,595	
September 28	Drake*	Veterans Memorial Stadium; Long Beach, CA	W 20–13	4,778	
October 5	at San Jose State	Spartan Stadium; San Jose, CA	L 17–27	17,250	
October 12	Cal State Fullerton*	Anaheim Stadium; Anaheim, CA	W 28–6	7,312	
October 19	at Hawaii*	Honolulu Stadium; Honolulu, HI	L 21–28	20,278	
October 26	San Diego State	Veterans Memorial Stadium; Long Beach, CA	L 17–27	27,775	
November 2	Southern Illinois*	Veterans Memorial Stadium; Long Beach, CA	W 32–7	6,084	
November 9	at Fresno State	Ratcliffe Stadium; Fresno, CA	W 28–34	8,850	
November 16	Western Michigan*	Veterans Memorial Stadium; Long Beach, CA	W 34–33	5,026	
November 23	at North Texas State*	Fouts Field; Denton, TX	W 35–19	2,500	
*Non-conference game

== Team players in the NFL ==
The following were selected in the 1975 NFL draft.

Player	Position	Round	Overall	NFL team
Louis Lauriano	Defensive back	8	202	St. Louis Cardinals
