= 1974 Villanova Wildcats football team =

American college football season

1974 Villanova Wildcats football
- Conference: Independent
- Record: 3–8
- Head coach: Jim Weaver (1st season; first 8 games); Lou Ferry (interim, final 3 games)
- Captains: Richard Aldrich; Charles Driesbach
- Home stadium: Villanova Stadium

1974 NCAA Division I independents football records
	Conf.			Overall
Team	W	L	T	W		L		T
No. 6 Notre Dame		–		10	–	2	–	0
No. 7 Penn State		–		10	–	2	–	0
Temple		–		8	–	2	–	0
Boston College		–		8	–	3	–	0
Utah State		–		8	–	3	–	0
No. 19 Houston		–		8	–	3	–	1
Rutgers		–		7	–	3	–	1
Cincinnati		–		7	–	4	–	0
Memphis State		–		7	–	4	–	0
Pittsburgh		–		7	–	4	–	0
Georgia Tech		–		6	–	5	–	0
Hawaii		–		6	–	5	–	0
Miami (FL)		–		6	–	5	–	0
Southern Miss		–		6	–	5	–	0
Tampa		–		6	–	5	–	0
Holy Cross		–		5	–	5	–	1
Tulane		–		5	–	6	–	0
Colgate		–		4	–	6	–	0
Northern Illinois		–		4	–	7	–	0
Navy		–		4	–	7	–	0
South Carolina		–		4	–	7	–	0
Virginia Tech		–		4	–	7	–	0
West Virginia		–		4	–	7	–	0
Army		–		3	–	8	–	0
Dayton		–		3	–	8	–	0
Villanova		–		3	–	8	–	0
Air Force		–		2	–	9	–	0
Southern Illinois		–		2	–	9	–	0
Syracuse		–		2	–	9	–	0
Florida State		–		1	–	10	–	0
Marshall		–		1	–	10	–	0
Rankings from AP Poll

The 1974 Villanova Wildcats football team represented the Villanova University as an independent during the 1974 NCAA Division I football season. Jim Weaver was the team's head coach for the first eight games of the season, before he was fired after the disclosure of his intentions to quit at the end of the season and take an administrative position at Clarion State College. Lou Ferry, who had been Villanova's head coach from 1970 to 1973 and remained as the team's defensive line coach in 1974, assumed the role of interim head coach for the last three games of the season. The team played their home games at Villanova Stadium in Villanova, Pennsylvania. Villanova was 3–1 and ranked seventh in the Lambert Trophy poll after four games, but lost their final seven contests and finished the season with a record of 3–8.

== Schedule ==
Date	Time	Opponent	Site	Result	Attendance	Source
September 7		at Richmond	City Stadium; Richmond, VA	L 13–14	5,000	
September 14	1:30 pm	UMass*	Villanova Stadium; Villanova, PA	W 17–13	7,807	
September 21		at Toledo	Glass Bowl; Toledo, OH	W 7–0	14,871	
September 28	1:30 pm	Idaho^{†}	Villanova Stadium; Villanova, PA	W 15–7	9,857	
October 12		at Tampa	Tampa Stadium; Tampa, FL	L 8–47	18,500	
October 19		at Houston	Houston Astrodome; Houston, TX	L 0–35	24,525	
October 26	1:30 pm	Boston College	Villanova Stadium; Villanova, PA (Parents Weekend)	L 7–55	11,100	
November 2		at No. 3 (small) Delaware	Delaware Stadium; Newark, DE (rivalry)	L 7–49	22,091	
November 9		at No. 14 Maryland	Byrd Stadium; College Park, MD	L 0–41	42,331	
November 16	1:30 pm	Holy Cross	Villanova Stadium; Villanova, PA	L 6–10	5,075	
November 23	1:30 pm	vs. Temple	Veterans Stadium; Philadelphia, PA (Mayor's Cup)	L 7–17	17,085	
*Non-conference game; ^{†}Homecoming; Rankings from AP Poll released prior to the game
