= 1974 Tampa Spartans football team =

American college football season

1974 Tampa Spartans football
- Conference: Independent
- Record: 6–5
- Head coach: Dennis Fryzel (2nd season)
- Offensive coordinator: Jim Ragland (2nd season)
- Defensive coordinator: Wayne Chapman (2nd season)
- Home stadium: Tampa Stadium

1974 NCAA Division I independents football records
	Conf.			Overall
Team	W	L	T	W		L		T
No. 6 Notre Dame		–		10	–	2	–	0
No. 7 Penn State		–		10	–	2	–	0
Temple		–		8	–	2	–	0
Boston College		–		8	–	3	–	0
Utah State		–		8	–	3	–	0
No. 19 Houston		–		8	–	3	–	1
Rutgers		–		7	–	3	–	1
Cincinnati		–		7	–	4	–	0
Memphis State		–		7	–	4	–	0
Pittsburgh		–		7	–	4	–	0
Georgia Tech		–		6	–	5	–	0
Hawaii		–		6	–	5	–	0
Miami (FL)		–		6	–	5	–	0
Southern Miss		–		6	–	5	–	0
Tampa		–		6	–	5	–	0
Holy Cross		–		5	–	5	–	1
Tulane		–		5	–	6	–	0
Colgate		–		4	–	6	–	0
Northern Illinois		–		4	–	7	–	0
Navy		–		4	–	7	–	0
South Carolina		–		4	–	7	–	0
Virginia Tech		–		4	–	7	–	0
West Virginia		–		4	–	7	–	0
Army		–		3	–	8	–	0
Dayton		–		3	–	8	–	0
Villanova		–		3	–	8	–	0
Air Force		–		2	–	9	–	0
Southern Illinois		–		2	–	9	–	0
Syracuse		–		2	–	9	–	0
Florida State		–		1	–	10	–	0
Marshall		–		1	–	10	–	0
Rankings from AP Poll

The 1974 Tampa Spartans football team represented the University of Tampa in the 1974 NCAA Division I football season. It was the Spartans' 38th season and they competed as an NCAA Division I independent. The team was led by head coach Dennis Fryzel, in his second year, and played their home games at Tampa Stadium in Tampa, Florida. They finished with a record of six wins and five losses (6–5). On February 27, 1975, the University of Tampa Board of Trustees voted to disband the Spartans football program effective for the 1975 season. Financial hardship was cited as the primary reason for its being disbanded.

== Schedule ==
Date	Opponent	Site	Result	Attendance	Source
September 7	at Chattanooga	Chamberlain Field; Chattanooga, TN	W 28–0	7,500	
September 14	at Toledo	Tampa Stadium; Tampa, FL	W 47–13	22,687	
September 21	at San Diego State	San Diego Stadium; San Diego, CA	L 25–28	30,639	
September 28	No. 20 Miami (FL)	Tampa Stadium; Tampa, FL	L 26–28	40,627	
October 5	at Akron	Rubber Bowl; Akron, OH	W 16–7	10,092	
October 12	Villanova	Tampa Stadium; Tampa, FL	W 48–7	18,500	
October 19	vs. Southwestern Louisiana	Tangerine Bowl; Orlando, FL	W 14–13	5,176	
October 26	Tulsa	Tampa Stadium; Tampa, FL	L 21–31	18,295	
November 9	West Texas State	Tampa Stadium; Tampa, FL	L 6–24	15,517	
November 23	Southern Miss	Tampa Stadium; Tampa, FL	L 10–11	14,837	
November 30	Florida A&M	Tampa Stadium; Tampa, FL	W 35–10	24,541	
Rankings from AP Poll released prior to the game
