= 1974 Boston College Eagles football team =

American college football season

1974 Boston College Eagles football
- Conference: Independent
- Record: 8–3
- Head coach: Joe Yukica (7th season)
- Captains: Brian Clemente; Mike Esposito; Ken Ladd; Alex MacLellan
- Home stadium: Alumni Stadium

1974 NCAA Division I independents football records
	Conf.			Overall
Team	W	L	T	W		L		T
No. 6 Notre Dame		–		10	–	2	–	0
No. 7 Penn State		–		10	–	2	–	0
Temple		–		8	–	2	–	0
Boston College		–		8	–	3	–	0
Utah State		–		8	–	3	–	0
No. 19 Houston		–		8	–	3	–	1
Rutgers		–		7	–	3	–	1
Cincinnati		–		7	–	4	–	0
Memphis State		–		7	–	4	–	0
Pittsburgh		–		7	–	4	–	0
Georgia Tech		–		6	–	5	–	0
Hawaii		–		6	–	5	–	0
Miami (FL)		–		6	–	5	–	0
Southern Miss		–		6	–	5	–	0
Tampa		–		6	–	5	–	0
Holy Cross		–		5	–	5	–	1
Tulane		–		5	–	6	–	0
Colgate		–		4	–	6	–	0
Northern Illinois		–		4	–	7	–	0
Navy		–		4	–	7	–	0
South Carolina		–		4	–	7	–	0
Virginia Tech		–		4	–	7	–	0
West Virginia		–		4	–	7	–	0
Army		–		3	–	8	–	0
Dayton		–		3	–	8	–	0
Villanova		–		3	–	8	–	0
Air Force		–		2	–	9	–	0
Southern Illinois		–		2	–	9	–	0
Syracuse		–		2	–	9	–	0
Florida State		–		1	–	10	–	0
Marshall		–		1	–	10	–	0
Rankings from AP Poll

The 1974 Boston College Eagles football team represented Boston College as an independent during the 1974 NCAA Division I football season. In its seventh season under head coach Joe Yukica, the team compiled an 8–3 record and outscored opponents by a total of 365 to 154.

Quarterback Mike Kruczek set an NCAA major college, single-season record by completing 68.9% of his passes. He completed 104 of 151 passes for 1,274 passing yards, six touchdowns, and seven interceptions. Running back Keith Barnette totaled 1,097 rushing yards and 132 points scored on 22 rushing touchdowns, and wide receiver Dave Zumbach had 43 receptions for 557 yards and four touchdowns.

The team played its home games at Alumni Stadium in Chestnut Hill, Massachusetts.

== Schedule ==
Date	Opponent	Site	Result	Attendance	Source
September 14	No. 10 Texas	Alumni Stadium; Chestnut Hill, MA	L 19–42	32,227	
September 28	at Temple	Temple Stadium; Philadelphia, PA	L 7–34	12,282	
October 5	at Navy	Navy–Marine Corps Memorial Stadium; Annapolis, MD	W 37–0	16,178	
October 12	William & Mary	Alumni Stadium; Chestnut Hill, MA	W 31–16	18,360	
October 19	at Pittsburgh	Pitt Stadium; Pittsburgh, PA	L 11–35	32,149	
October 26	at Villanova	Villanova Stadium; Villanova, PA	W 55–7	11,100	
November 2	West Virginia	Alumni Stadium; Chestnut Hill, MA	W 35–3	19,062	
November 9	Tulane	Alumni Stadium; Chestnut Hill, MA	W 27–3	17,220	
November 16	Syracuse	Alumni Stadium; Chestnut Hill, MA	W 35–0	18,651	
November 23	at UMass	Alumni Stadium; Hadley, MA (rivalry)	W 70–8	15,000–15,900	
November 30	Holy Cross	Alumni Stadium; Chestnut Hill, MA (rivalry)	W 38–6	28,497	
Rankings from AP Poll released prior to the game
