= 1974 Northern Illinois Huskies football team =

American college football season

1974 Northern Illinois Huskies football
- Conference: Independent
- Record: 4–7
- Head coach: Jerry Ippoliti (4th season)
- MVPs: Tim Peters; Tom Plesha
- Captains: Jerry Golsteyn; Tom Plesha
- Home stadium: Huskie Stadium

1974 NCAA Division I independents football records
	Conf.			Overall
Team	W	L	T	W		L		T
No. 6 Notre Dame		–		10	–	2	–	0
No. 7 Penn State		–		10	–	2	–	0
Temple		–		8	–	2	–	0
Boston College		–		8	–	3	–	0
Utah State		–		8	–	3	–	0
No. 19 Houston		–		8	–	3	–	1
Rutgers		–		7	–	3	–	1
Cincinnati		–		7	–	4	–	0
Memphis State		–		7	–	4	–	0
Pittsburgh		–		7	–	4	–	0
Georgia Tech		–		6	–	5	–	0
Hawaii		–		6	–	5	–	0
Miami (FL)		–		6	–	5	–	0
Southern Miss		–		6	–	5	–	0
Tampa		–		6	–	5	–	0
Holy Cross		–		5	–	5	–	1
Tulane		–		5	–	6	–	0
Colgate		–		4	–	6	–	0
Northern Illinois		–		4	–	7	–	0
Navy		–		4	–	7	–	0
South Carolina		–		4	–	7	–	0
Virginia Tech		–		4	–	7	–	0
West Virginia		–		4	–	7	–	0
Army		–		3	–	8	–	0
Dayton		–		3	–	8	–	0
Villanova		–		3	–	8	–	0
Air Force		–		2	–	9	–	0
Southern Illinois		–		2	–	9	–	0
Syracuse		–		2	–	9	–	0
Florida State		–		1	–	10	–	0
Marshall		–		1	–	10	–	0
Rankings from AP Poll

The 1974 Northern Illinois Huskies football team represented Northern Illinois University as an independent during the 1974 NCAA Division I football season. Led by fourth-year head coach Jerry Ippoliti, the Huskies compiled a record of 4–7. Northern Illinois played home games at Huskie Stadium in DeKalb, Illinois. This was their last year as an independent team, as they moved to the Mid-American Conference the following season.

== Schedule ==
Date	Opponent	Site	Result	Attendance	Source
September 7	at McNeese State	Cowboy Stadium; Lake Charles, LA	L 16–19	11,500	
September 14	Long Beach State	Huskie Stadium; DeKalb, IL	W 16–14	8,428	
September 21	Western Michigan	Huskies Stadium; DeKalb, IL	L 13–30		
September 28	Indiana State	Huskie Stadium; DeKalb, IL	L 14–23	5,073	
October 5	at Ohio	Peden Stadium; Athens, OH	L 14–31		
October 12	at Marshall	Fairfield Stadium; Huntington, WV	W 20–17		
October 19	at Southern Illinois	McAndrew Stadium; Carbondale, IL	W 17–7	5,000	
October 26	Illinois State	Huskie Stadium; DeKalb, IL	L 14–24	14,470	
November 2	at Toledo	Glass Bowl; Toledo, OH	L 14–44	12,326	
November 9	at Ball State	Ball State Stadium; Muncie, IN (rivalry)	L 21–31	10,127	
November 16	Idaho	Huskie Stadium; DeKalb, IL	W 27–21	3,712	
