= 1974 South Carolina Gamecocks football team =

American college football season

1974 South Carolina Gamecocks football
- Conference: Independent
- Record: 4–7
- Head coach: Paul Dietzel (9th season)
- Captains: Jay Hodgin; Jerry Witherspoon
- Home stadium: Williams–Brice Stadium

1974 NCAA Division I independents football records
	Conf.			Overall
Team	W	L	T	W		L		T
No. 6 Notre Dame		–		10	–	2	–	0
No. 7 Penn State		–		10	–	2	–	0
Temple		–		8	–	2	–	0
Boston College		–		8	–	3	–	0
Utah State		–		8	–	3	–	0
No. 19 Houston		–		8	–	3	–	1
Rutgers		–		7	–	3	–	1
Cincinnati		–		7	–	4	–	0
Memphis State		–		7	–	4	–	0
Pittsburgh		–		7	–	4	–	0
Georgia Tech		–		6	–	5	–	0
Hawaii		–		6	–	5	–	0
Miami (FL)		–		6	–	5	–	0
Southern Miss		–		6	–	5	–	0
Tampa		–		6	–	5	–	0
Holy Cross		–		5	–	5	–	1
Tulane		–		5	–	6	–	0
Colgate		–		4	–	6	–	0
Northern Illinois		–		4	–	7	–	0
Navy		–		4	–	7	–	0
South Carolina		–		4	–	7	–	0
Virginia Tech		–		4	–	7	–	0
West Virginia		–		4	–	7	–	0
Army		–		3	–	8	–	0
Dayton		–		3	–	8	–	0
Villanova		–		3	–	8	–	0
Air Force		–		2	–	9	–	0
Southern Illinois		–		2	–	9	–	0
Syracuse		–		2	–	9	–	0
Florida State		–		1	–	10	–	0
Marshall		–		1	–	10	–	0
Rankings from AP Poll

The 1974 South Carolina Gamecocks football team represented the University of South Carolina as an independent in the 1974 NCAA Division I football season. Led by Paul Dietzel, in his ninth and final season as head coach, the Gamecocks compiled a record of 4–7. The team played home games at Williams–Brice Stadium in Columbia, South Carolina.

Following an 0–2 start, Dietzel announced he would be resigning as head coach at the end of the season, but stated his wishes to remain as athletic director. Dietzel finished his tenure at South Carolina with a 42–53–1 record.

== Schedule ==
Date	Opponent	Site	Result	Attendance	Source
September 14	at Georgia Tech	Grant Field; Atlanta, GA	L 20–35	47,171	
September 21	Duke	Williams–Brice Stadium; Columbia, SC	L 14–20	45,620	
September 28	at Georgia	Sanford Stadium; Athens, GA (rivalry)	L 14–52	50,200	
October 5	Houston	Williams–Brice Stadium; Columbia, SC	L 14–24	38,147	
October 12	Virginia Tech	Williams–Brice Stadium; Columbia, SC	L 17–31	35,897	
October 19	at Ole Miss	Hemingway Stadium; Oxford, MS	W 10–7	32,800	
October 26	North Carolina	Williams–Brice Stadium; Columbia, SC (rivalry)	W 31–23	41,512	
November 2	at NC State	Carter Stadium; Raleigh, NC	L 27–42	41,500	
November 9	Appalachian State	Williams–Brice Stadium; Columbia, SC	W 21–18	32,285	
November 16	Wake Forest	Williams–Brice Stadium; Columbia, SC	W 34–21	27,677	
November 23	at Clemson	Memorial Stadium; Clemson, SC (rivalry)	L 21–39	52,677	
