= 1974 Houston Cougars football team =

American college football season

1974 Houston Cougars football
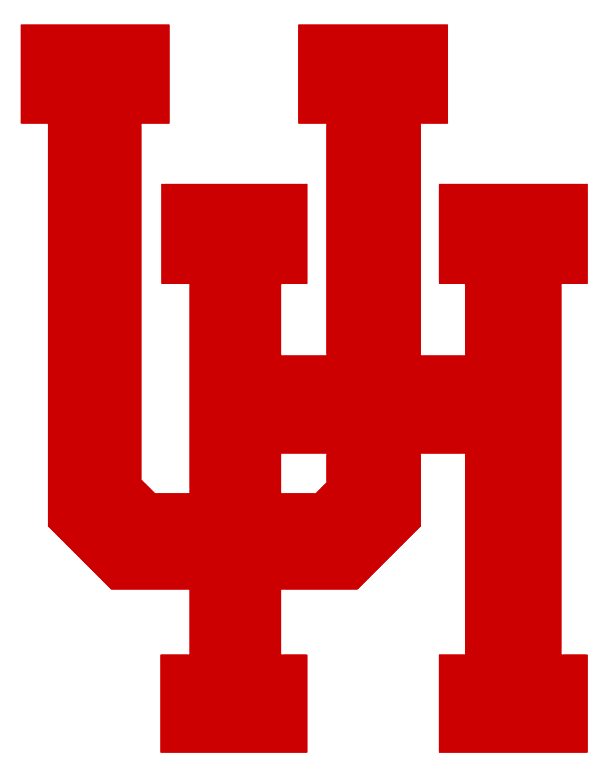

Astro-Bluebonnet Bowl, T 31–31 vs. NC State
- Conference: Independent

Ranking
- Coaches: No. 11
- AP: No. 19
- Record: 8–3–1
- Head coach: Bill Yeoman (13th season)
- Offensive scheme: Houston Veer
- Defensive coordinator: Don Todd (3rd season)
- Captains: Bubba Broussard; Robert Giblin; Mack Mitchell
- Home stadium: Houston Astrodome

1974 NCAA Division I independents football records
	Conf.			Overall
Team	W	L	T	W		L		T
No. 6 Notre Dame		–		10	–	2	–	0
No. 7 Penn State		–		10	–	2	–	0
Temple		–		8	–	2	–	0
Boston College		–		8	–	3	–	0
Utah State		–		8	–	3	–	0
No. 19 Houston		–		8	–	3	–	1
Rutgers		–		7	–	3	–	1
Cincinnati		–		7	–	4	–	0
Memphis State		–		7	–	4	–	0
Pittsburgh		–		7	–	4	–	0
Georgia Tech		–		6	–	5	–	0
Hawaii		–		6	–	5	–	0
Miami (FL)		–		6	–	5	–	0
Southern Miss		–		6	–	5	–	0
Tampa		–		6	–	5	–	0
Holy Cross		–		5	–	5	–	1
Tulane		–		5	–	6	–	0
Colgate		–		4	–	6	–	0
Northern Illinois		–		4	–	7	–	0
Navy		–		4	–	7	–	0
South Carolina		–		4	–	7	–	0
Virginia Tech		–		4	–	7	–	0
West Virginia		–		4	–	7	–	0
Army		–		3	–	8	–	0
Dayton		–		3	–	8	–	0
Villanova		–		3	–	8	–	0
Air Force		–		2	–	9	–	0
Southern Illinois		–		2	–	9	–	0
Syracuse		–		2	–	9	–	0
Florida State		–		1	–	10	–	0
Marshall		–		1	–	10	–	0
Rankings from AP Poll

The 1974 Houston Cougars football team represented the University of Houston in the 1974 NCAA Division I football season. The team was coached by 13th-year head coach Bill Yeoman, compiled an 8–3–1 record, and outscored their opponents by a total of 280 to 185.

== Schedule ==
Date	Opponent	Rank	Site	TV	Result	Attendance	Source
September 7	at No. 15 Arizona State	No. 11	Sun Devil Stadium; Tempe, AZ		L 9–30	50,227	
September 14	at Rice	No. 19	Rice Stadium; Houston, TX (rivalry)		W 21–0	40,000	
September 21	Miami (FL)	No. 19	Houston Astrodome; Houston, TX	ABC	L 3–20	18,767	
September 28	at Virginia Tech		Lane Stadium; Blacksburg, VA		W 49–12	30,000	
October 5	at South Carolina		Williams–Brice Stadium; Columbia, SC		W 24–14	38,147	
October 19	Villanova		Houston Astrodome; Houston, TX		W 35–0	24,525	
October 25	Cincinnati		Houston Astrodome; Houston, TX		W 27–6	19,193	
November 2	at Georgia		Sanford Stadium; Athens, GA		W 31–24	48,100	
November 16	Memphis State^{†}	No. 14	Houston Astrodome; Houston, TX		W 13–10	23,893	
November 23	at Florida State	No. 15	Doak Campbell Stadium; Tallahassee, FL		W 23–8	18,195	
November 30	at Tulsa	No. 15	Skelly Stadium; Tulsa, OK		L 14–30	15,500	
December 23	No. 13 NC State		Houston Astrodome; Houston, TX (Astro-Bluebonnet Bowl)	ABC	T 31–31	35,122	
^{†}Homecoming; Rankings from AP Poll released prior to the game
