= 1974 Navy Midshipmen football team =

American college football season

1974 Navy Midshipmen football
- Conference: Independent
- Record: 4–7
- Head coach: George Welsh (2nd season)
- Captains: Cliff Collier; Tim Harden
- Home stadium: Navy–Marine Corps Memorial Stadium

1974 NCAA Division I independents football records
	Conf.			Overall
Team	W	L	T	W		L		T
No. 6 Notre Dame		–		10	–	2	–	0
No. 7 Penn State		–		10	–	2	–	0
Temple		–		8	–	2	–	0
Boston College		–		8	–	3	–	0
Utah State		–		8	–	3	–	0
No. 19 Houston		–		8	–	3	–	1
Rutgers		–		7	–	3	–	1
Cincinnati		–		7	–	4	–	0
Memphis State		–		7	–	4	–	0
Pittsburgh		–		7	–	4	–	0
Georgia Tech		–		6	–	5	–	0
Hawaii		–		6	–	5	–	0
Miami (FL)		–		6	–	5	–	0
Southern Miss		–		6	–	5	–	0
Tampa		–		6	–	5	–	0
Holy Cross		–		5	–	5	–	1
Tulane		–		5	–	6	–	0
Colgate		–		4	–	6	–	0
Northern Illinois		–		4	–	7	–	0
Navy		–		4	–	7	–	0
South Carolina		–		4	–	7	–	0
Virginia Tech		–		4	–	7	–	0
West Virginia		–		4	–	7	–	0
Army		–		3	–	8	–	0
Dayton		–		3	–	8	–	0
Villanova		–		3	–	8	–	0
Air Force		–		2	–	9	–	0
Southern Illinois		–		2	–	9	–	0
Syracuse		–		2	–	9	–	0
Florida State		–		1	–	10	–	0
Marshall		–		1	–	10	–	0
Rankings from AP Poll

The 1974 Navy Midshipmen football team represented the United States Naval Academy (USNA) as an independent during the 1974 NCAA Division I football season. The team was led by second-year head coach George Welsh.

== Schedule ==
Date	Opponent	Site	Result	Attendance	Source
September 14	Virginia	Navy–Marine Corps Memorial Stadium; Annapolis, MD	W 35–28	16,987	
September 21	at No. 8 Penn State	Beaver Stadium; University Park, PA	W 7–6	42,000	
September 28	at No. 5 Michigan	Michigan Stadium; Ann Arbor, MI	L 0–52	104,232	
October 5	Boston College	Navy–Marine Corps Memorial Stadium; Annapolis, MD	L 0–37	16,178	
October 12	at Syracuse	Archbold Stadium; Syracuse, NY	L 9–17	20,193	
October 19	at Air Force	Falcon Stadium; Colorado Springs, CO (Commander-in-Chief's Trophy)	L 16–19	35,673	
October 26	Pittsburgh^{†}	Navy–Marine Corps Memorial Stadium; Annapolis, MD	L 11–13	24,820	
November 2	vs. No. 7 Notre Dame	Veterans Stadium; Philadelphia, PA (rivalry)	L 6–14	48,634	
November 9	The Citadel	Navy–Marine Corps Memorial Stadium; Annapolis, MD	W 28–21	16,907	
November 16	at Georgia Tech	Grant Field; Atlanta, GA	L 0–22	41,132	
November 30	vs. Army	John F. Kennedy Stadium; Philadelphia, PA (Army–Navy Game)	W 19–0	83,247	
^{†}Homecoming; Rankings from AP Poll released prior to the game

== Game summaries ==
=== vs Army ===
Army Cadets (3–7) vs. Navy Midshipmen (3–7)

Quarter	1	2	3	4	Total
Army	0	0	0	0	0
Navy	10	7	2	0	19

at JFK Stadium, Philadelphia, Pennsylvania

- Date: November 30, 1974
- Game attendance: 83,246
- TV announcers (ABC): Chris Schenkel and Ben Martin

Game information

First quarter

- NAVY – Steve Dykes 45-yard field goal. Navy 3–0.
- NAVY – Bob Jackson 3-yard run (Steve Dykes kick). Navy 10–0. Drive: 4 plays.

Second quarter

- NAVY – Bob Jackson 6-yard run (Steve Dykes kick), 9:32. Navy 17–0. Drive: 7 plays, 65 yards.

Third quarter

- NAVY – Safety, Scott Gillogly tackled by Tim Harden in end zone. Navy 19–0.

Fourth quarter

- No scoring

Top rushers

- NAVY – Cleveland Cooper – 105 yards

75th meeting; President Gerald Ford in attendance

External videos
- Full game
- Game highlights

== Roster ==
1974 Navy Midshipmen football team roster
Players
Coaches
Offense

Pos.	#	Name	Class
WR		Robin Ameen	Sr
G		Steve Barilich	Jr
G		Cliff Collier	Sr
RB	25	Cleveland Cooper	Sr
G		Bill Driscoll	Sr
OT		Richard Feckler	Jr
RB	22	Ed Gilmore	Jr
FB		Gerry Goodwin	Fr
OL		Mike Grimes	Fr
FB		Bob Jackson	Jr
WR		Ike Owens
QB	16	Phillip Poirier	Jr
OT		Mark Poston	Fr
C		Gary Reed
QB		Mike Roban	Fr
OT		Randall Seaward
TE		Kevin Sullivan
TE		Jim Wooley
WR		Mike Yeager

Defense

Pos.	#	Name	Class
LB		Andy Bushak
DB		Derwood Curtis
DB		Gene Ford
LB		Tom Gardner
DE		Tim Harden
LB		Jeff Hoobler
LB		Randy Hutcherson
DB		Ed Jeter
DL		Skip Lind
DT		George Markulis
S	48	Chet Moeller	Jr
DB		Len Mokan
DT		Dave Papak
LB		Jeff Scott
DE		Mark Thorpe
DT		Ken Trass

Special teams

Pos.	#	Name	Class
K		Steve Dykes
P		John Stufflebeen

Head coach

- George Welsh

Coordinators/assistant coaches

- Len Fontes – Defensive backs

Legend

- (C) Team captain
- (S) Suspended
- (I) Ineligible
- Injured
- Redshirt

- Not listed (missing number/class/position): Carl Sharperson
