= 1974 Syracuse Orangemen football team =

American college football season

1974 Syracuse Orangemen football
- Conference: Independent
- Record: 2–9
- Head coach: Frank Maloney (1st season)
- Offensive coordinator: Paul Schudel (1st season)
- Captains: Bob Petchel; John Rafferty
- Home stadium: Archbold Stadium

1974 NCAA Division I independents football records
	Conf.			Overall
Team	W	L	T	W		L		T
No. 6 Notre Dame		–		10	–	2	–	0
No. 7 Penn State		–		10	–	2	–	0
Temple		–		8	–	2	–	0
Boston College		–		8	–	3	–	0
Utah State		–		8	–	3	–	0
No. 19 Houston		–		8	–	3	–	1
Rutgers		–		7	–	3	–	1
Cincinnati		–		7	–	4	–	0
Memphis State		–		7	–	4	–	0
Pittsburgh		–		7	–	4	–	0
Georgia Tech		–		6	–	5	–	0
Hawaii		–		6	–	5	–	0
Miami (FL)		–		6	–	5	–	0
Southern Miss		–		6	–	5	–	0
Tampa		–		6	–	5	–	0
Holy Cross		–		5	–	5	–	1
Tulane		–		5	–	6	–	0
Colgate		–		4	–	6	–	0
Northern Illinois		–		4	–	7	–	0
Navy		–		4	–	7	–	0
South Carolina		–		4	–	7	–	0
Virginia Tech		–		4	–	7	–	0
West Virginia		–		4	–	7	–	0
Army		–		3	–	8	–	0
Dayton		–		3	–	8	–	0
Villanova		–		3	–	8	–	0
Air Force		–		2	–	9	–	0
Southern Illinois		–		2	–	9	–	0
Syracuse		–		2	–	9	–	0
Florida State		–		1	–	10	–	0
Marshall		–		1	–	10	–	0
Rankings from AP Poll

The 1974 Syracuse Orangemen football team represented Syracuse University as an independent during the 1974 NCAA Division I football season. The team was led by first-year head coach Frank Maloney and played its home games at Archbold Stadium in Syracuse, New York. The team finished with a record of 2–9.

== Schedule ==
Date	Opponent	Site	Result	Attendance	Source
September 7	Oregon State	Archbold Stadium; Syracuse, NY	W 23–15	23,410	
September 14	Kent State	Archbold Stadium; Syracuse, NY	L 14–20	20,798	
September 21	at Michigan State	Spartan Stadium; East Lansing, MI	L 0–19	66,847	
September 28	No. 13 NC State	Archbold Stadium; Syracuse, NY	L 22–28	17,997	
October 5	Maryland	Archbold Stadium; Syracuse, NY	L 0–31	19,130	
October 12	Navy	Archbold Stadium; Syracuse, NY	W 17–9	20,193	
October 19	at No. 11 Penn State	Beaver Stadium; University Park, PA (rivalry)	L 14–30	59,100	
November 2	Pittsburgh	Archbold Stadium; Syracuse, NY (rivalry)	L 13–21	25,177	
November 9	at West Virginia	Mountaineer Field; Morgantown, WV (rivalry)	L 11–39	24,200	
November 16	at Boston College	Alumni Stadium; Chestnut Hill, MA	L 0–35	18,651	
November 22	at Miami (FL)	Miami Orange Bowl; Miami, FL	L 7–14	12,208	
Rankings from AP Poll released prior to the game

== Roster ==
1974 Syracuse Orangemen football team roster
Players
Coaches
Offense

Pos.	#	Name	Class
QB	12	James Donoghue	Jr

Defense

Pos.	#	Name	Class
DB	28	Keith Moody	Jr
DB	7	Tim Moresco	So
LB	33	Ray Preston	Jr

Special teams

Pos.	#	Name	Class

Head coach

- Frank Maloney

Coordinators/assistant coaches

Legend

- (C) Team captain
- (S) Suspended
- (I) Ineligible
- Injured
- Redshirt
