= 1974 Utah State Aggies football team =

American college football season

1974 Utah State Aggies football
- Conference: Independent
- Record: 8–3
- Head coach: Phil Krueger (2nd season)
- Home stadium: Romney Stadium

1974 NCAA Division I independents football records
	Conf.			Overall
Team	W	L	T	W		L		T
No. 6 Notre Dame		–		10	–	2	–	0
No. 7 Penn State		–		10	–	2	–	0
Temple		–		8	–	2	–	0
Boston College		–		8	–	3	–	0
Utah State		–		8	–	3	–	0
No. 19 Houston		–		8	–	3	–	1
Rutgers		–		7	–	3	–	1
Cincinnati		–		7	–	4	–	0
Memphis State		–		7	–	4	–	0
Pittsburgh		–		7	–	4	–	0
Georgia Tech		–		6	–	5	–	0
Hawaii		–		6	–	5	–	0
Miami (FL)		–		6	–	5	–	0
Southern Miss		–		6	–	5	–	0
Tampa		–		6	–	5	–	0
Holy Cross		–		5	–	5	–	1
Tulane		–		5	–	6	–	0
Colgate		–		4	–	6	–	0
Northern Illinois		–		4	–	7	–	0
Navy		–		4	–	7	–	0
South Carolina		–		4	–	7	–	0
Virginia Tech		–		4	–	7	–	0
West Virginia		–		4	–	7	–	0
Army		–		3	–	8	–	0
Dayton		–		3	–	8	–	0
Villanova		–		3	–	8	–	0
Air Force		–		2	–	9	–	0
Southern Illinois		–		2	–	9	–	0
Syracuse		–		2	–	9	–	0
Florida State		–		1	–	10	–	0
Marshall		–		1	–	10	–	0
Rankings from AP Poll

The 1974 Utah State Aggies football team was an American football team that represented Utah State University as an independent during the 1974 NCAA Division I football season. In their second season under head coach Phil Krueger, the Aggies compiled an 8–3 record, but were outscored by opponents by a total of 199 to 181 – principally due to a 72–3 loss to 1974 national champion Oklahoma.

The team's statistical leaders included Bill Swanson with 614 passing yards, Louie Giammona with 1,534 rushing yards, Kory Coles with 225 receiving yards, Al Knapp with 67 points scored (16 field goals and 19 extra points), Larry Comadena with 16 pancake blocks, and Brian Longuevan with 138 total tackles.

== Schedule ==
Date	Opponent	Site	Result	Attendance	Source
September 14	at Wyoming	War Memorial Stadium; Laramie, WY (rivalry)	W 17–7	20,267	
September 21	at BYU	BYU Stadium; Provo, UT (rivalry)	W 9–6	34,455	
September 28	at No. 3 Oklahoma	Oklahoma Memorial Stadium; Norman, OK	L 3–72	61,826	
October 12	Colorado State	Romney Stadium; Logan, UT	W 24–23	9,008	
October 19	at Kent State	Dix Stadium; Kent, OH	W 27–24	9,722	
October 26	West Texas State	Romney Stadium; Logan, UT	W 21–16	12,355	
November 2	at Idaho	Idaho Stadium; Moscow, ID	W 17–3	5,005	
November 9	Southern Miss	Romney Stadium; Logan, UT	L 3–7	10,046	
November 16	Utah	Romney Stadium; Logan, UT (rivalry)	W 34–0	15,429	
November 23	Weber State	Romney Stadium; Logan, UT	W 20–7	9,744	
November 30	at San Diego State	San Diego Stadium; San Diego, CA	L 6–34	24,687	
Rankings from AP Poll released prior to the game
