= 1974 Colgate Red Raiders football team =

American college football season

1974 Colgate Red Raiders football
- Conference: Independent
- Record: 4–6
- Head coach: Neil Wheelwright (7th season)
- Captains: Robert Como; James Detmer
- Home stadium: Andy Kerr Stadium

1974 NCAA Division I independents football records
	Conf.			Overall
Team	W	L	T	W		L		T
No. 6 Notre Dame		–		10	–	2	–	0
No. 7 Penn State		–		10	–	2	–	0
Temple		–		8	–	2	–	0
Boston College		–		8	–	3	–	0
Utah State		–		8	–	3	–	0
No. 19 Houston		–		8	–	3	–	1
Rutgers		–		7	–	3	–	1
Cincinnati		–		7	–	4	–	0
Memphis State		–		7	–	4	–	0
Pittsburgh		–		7	–	4	–	0
Georgia Tech		–		6	–	5	–	0
Hawaii		–		6	–	5	–	0
Miami (FL)		–		6	–	5	–	0
Southern Miss		–		6	–	5	–	0
Tampa		–		6	–	5	–	0
Holy Cross		–		5	–	5	–	1
Tulane		–		5	–	6	–	0
Colgate		–		4	–	6	–	0
Northern Illinois		–		4	–	7	–	0
Navy		–		4	–	7	–	0
South Carolina		–		4	–	7	–	0
Virginia Tech		–		4	–	7	–	0
West Virginia		–		4	–	7	–	0
Army		–		3	–	8	–	0
Dayton		–		3	–	8	–	0
Villanova		–		3	–	8	–	0
Air Force		–		2	–	9	–	0
Southern Illinois		–		2	–	9	–	0
Syracuse		–		2	–	9	–	0
Florida State		–		1	–	10	–	0
Marshall		–		1	–	10	–	0
Rankings from AP Poll

The 1974 Colgate Red Raiders football team was an American football team that represented Colgate University as an independent during the 1974 NCAA Division I football season. In its seventh season under head coach Neil Wheelwright, the team compiled a 4–5 record. Robert Como and James Detmer were the team captains.

The team played its home games at Andy Kerr Stadium in Hamilton, New York.

== Schedule ==
Date	Opponent	Site	Result	Attendance	Source
September 21	Lehigh	Andy Kerr Stadium; Hamilton, NY	L 12–33	4,500	
September 28	at Cornell	Schoellkopf Field; Ithaca, NY (rivalry)	L 21–40	14,000	
October 5	at Yale	Yale Bowl; New Haven, CT	L 7–30	9,632	
October 12	Holy Cross	Andy Kerr Stadium; Hamilton, NY	W 21–16	7,000	
October 19	at Princeton	Palmer Stadium; Princeton, NJ	L 24–33	20,000	
October 26	at Lafayette	Fisher Field; Easton, PA	W 24–18	4,000	
November 2	UMass	Andy Kerr Stadium; Hamilton, NY	W 42–34	4,000	
November 9	at Bucknell	Memorial Stadium; Lewisburg, PA	W 34–21	6,000–7,250	
November 16	at VMI	Alumni Memorial Stadium; Lexington, VA	L 14–31	4,600	
November 23	at Rutgers	Rutgers Stadium; Piscataway, NJ	L 21–62	11,000	

== Leading players ==
Two trophies were awarded to the Red Raiders' most valuable players in 1974:

- Jim Detmar, guard, received the Andy Kerr Trophy, awarded to the most valuable offensive player.
- Ken Jasie, defensive tackle, received the Hal W. Lahar Trophy, awarded to the most valuable defensive player.

Statistical leaders for the 1974 Red Raiders included:

- Rushing: Pat Healy, 685 yards and 7 touchdowns on 121 attempts
- Passing: Bruce Basile, 910 yards, 57 completions and 7 touchdowns on 123 attempts
- Receiving: Dave Lake, 793 yards and 7 touchdowns on 39 receptions
- Total offense: Bruce Basile, 1,510 yards (910 passing, 600 rushing)
- Scoring: Pat Healy, 48 points from 8 touchdowns and 4 two-point conversions
- All-purpose yards: Pat Healy, 823 yards (685 rushing, 91 kickoff returning, 35 receiving, 21 punt returning)
