= 1975 Cotton Bowl Classic =

- 39th Cotton Bowl Classic
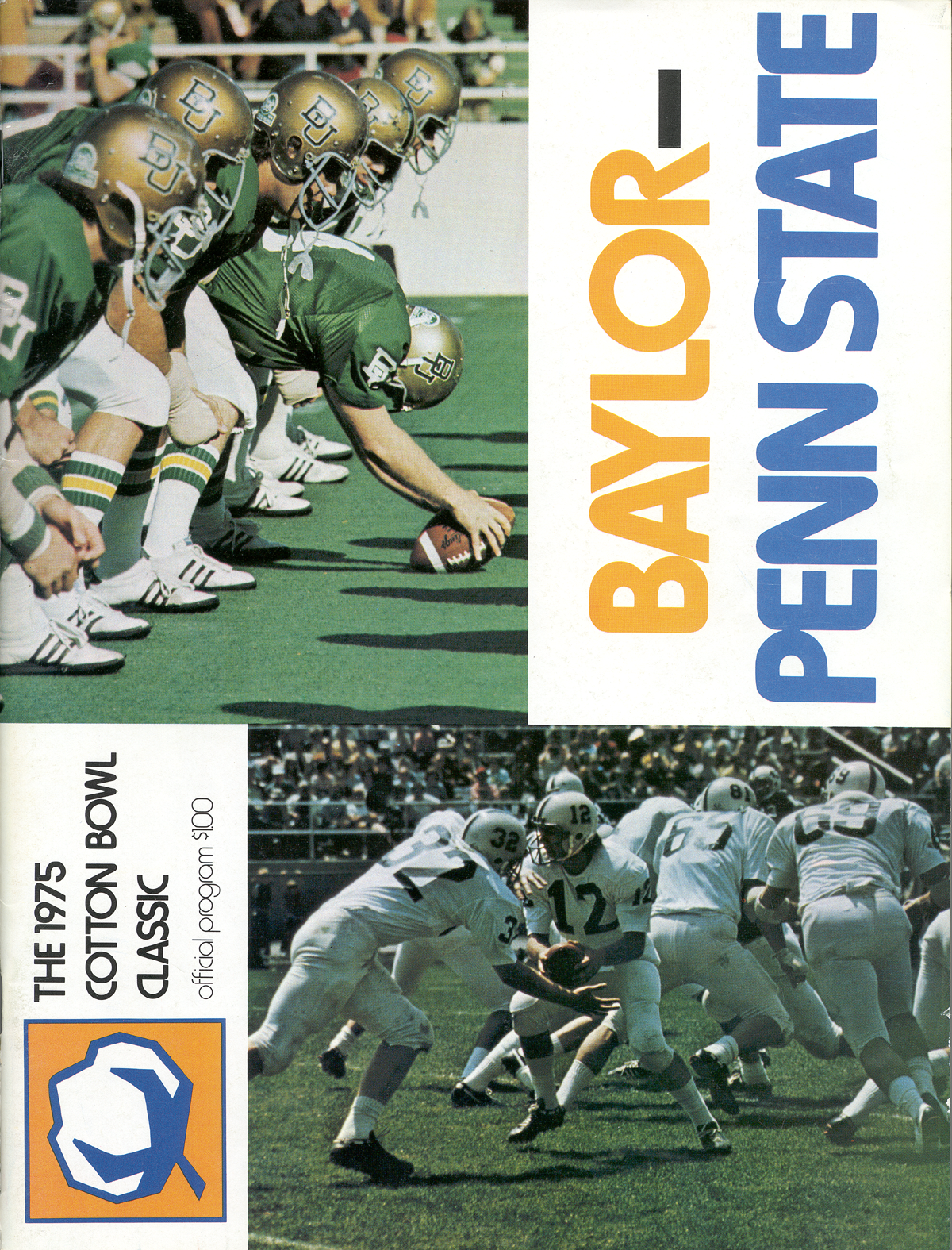
Penn State Nittany Lions	Baylor Bears
(9–2)	(8–3)
Independent	SWC
41	20
Head coach: Joe Paterno	Head coach: Grant Teaff
AP / Coaches; 7 / 6	AP / Coaches; 12 / 12
	1	2	3	4	Total
Penn State	0	3	14	24	41
Baylor	7	0	7	6	20
- Date: January 1, 1975
- Season: 1974
- Stadium: Cotton Bowl
- Location: Dallas, Texas
- MVP: QB Tom Shuman (Penn State); S Ken Quesenberry (Baylor)
- Referee: McDuff Simpson (SWC; split crew: SWC, ECAC)
- Attendance: 67,500–68,500

United States TV coverage
- Network: CBS

The Cotton Bowl in Dallas, Texas, hosted the Cotton Bowl Classic.

The 1975 Cotton Bowl Classic was played between the Baylor Bears and the Penn State Nittany Lions.

== Background ==
Baylor did the Miracle on the Brazos, winning the Southwest Conference championship for the first time since 1924, doing so after starting the season 0–2 by going 8–1 the rest of the way. They only lost one conference game (to A&M, who had two), but their most memorable win was against Texas, in which they came back from a 24–7 halftime deficit and beat the Longhorns for the first time in 17 years. This was Baylor's first Cotton Bowl Classic. The Nittany Lions were making their third appearance and second in the decade.

== Game summary ==
Steve Beaird gave the Bears the lead when he scored on a 4-yard touchdown run as the first quarter ended. Penn State retaliated with a Chris Bahr field goal with 1:09 left to narrow the lead to 7–3 at halftime. The Nittany Lions scored first with a Tom Donchez touchdown run. Baylor scored back with a Ricky Thompson touchdown catch from Neal Jeffrey. But Penn state scored on a Jimmy Cefalo catch from Tom Shuman as the Nittany Lions led 17–14 going into the fourth quarter. Things started to fall apart for the Bears in the fourth quarter. Jimmy Cefalo scored on a touchdown run to increase the lead. Bahr added in a field goal, and Mike Johnson intercepted a pass which led to a Shuman touchdown run. Running out of time, Thompson caught a touchdown pass from Mark Jackson with :14 left, missing the conversion. To add insult to injury, Joe Jackson returned the ensuing kickoff for a touchdown, making it 41–20 as the final seconds ticked off, giving Penn State their second Cotton Bowl Classic win.

Attendance for the game was estimated between 67,500 and 68,500.

== Statistics ==
Statistics	Penn State	Baylor
First downs	23	20
Yards rushing	265	138
Yards passing	226	175
Total yards	491	313
Punts-Average	2-36.5	6-34.0
Fumbles-Lost	3-2	4-0
Interceptions	0	2
Penalties-Yards	8-70	7-45

== In popular culture ==
This game was referenced in the January 31st, 1999 episode of the TV show Family Guy titled “Death has a Shadow” where Peter Griffin attempted to make amends with his wife Lois by dropping money onto the field. The announcers mistakenly made the claim that a similar event happened during this bowl game, although no such event transpired.
