= 1974 Hawaii Rainbow Warriors football team =

American college football season

1974 Hawaii Rainbow Warriors football
- Conference: Independent
- Record: 6–5
- Head coach: Larry Price (1st season)
- Home stadium: Honolulu Stadium

1974 NCAA Division I independents football records
	Conf.			Overall
Team	W	L	T	W		L		T
No. 6 Notre Dame		–		10	–	2	–	0
No. 7 Penn State		–		10	–	2	–	0
Temple		–		8	–	2	–	0
Boston College		–		8	–	3	–	0
Utah State		–		8	–	3	–	0
No. 19 Houston		–		8	–	3	–	1
Rutgers		–		7	–	3	–	1
Cincinnati		–		7	–	4	–	0
Memphis State		–		7	–	4	–	0
Pittsburgh		–		7	–	4	–	0
Georgia Tech		–		6	–	5	–	0
Hawaii		–		6	–	5	–	0
Miami (FL)		–		6	–	5	–	0
Southern Miss		–		6	–	5	–	0
Tampa		–		6	–	5	–	0
Holy Cross		–		5	–	5	–	1
Tulane		–		5	–	6	–	0
Colgate		–		4	–	6	–	0
Northern Illinois		–		4	–	7	–	0
Navy		–		4	–	7	–	0
South Carolina		–		4	–	7	–	0
Virginia Tech		–		4	–	7	–	0
West Virginia		–		4	–	7	–	0
Army		–		3	–	8	–	0
Dayton		–		3	–	8	–	0
Villanova		–		3	–	8	–	0
Air Force		–		2	–	9	–	0
Southern Illinois		–		2	–	9	–	0
Syracuse		–		2	–	9	–	0
Florida State		–		1	–	10	–	0
Marshall		–		1	–	10	–	0
Rankings from AP Poll

The 1974 Hawaii Rainbow Warriors football team represented the University of Hawaiʻi at Mānoa as an independent during the 1974 NCAA Division I football season. In their first season under head coach Larry Price, the Rainbow Warriors compiled a 6–5 record.

== Schedule ==
Date	Opponent	Site	Result	Attendance	Source
September 14	BYU	Honolulu Stadium; Honolulu, HI	W 15–13	23,000	
September 21	Humboldt State	Honolulu Stadium; Honolulu, HI	W 35–9	18,555	
October 5	at Pacific (CA)	Pacific Memorial Stadium; Stockton, CA	W 23–14	11,842	
October 19	Long Beach State	Honolulu Stadium; Honolulu, HI	W 28–21	20,278	
October 26	at No. 3 UNLV	Las Vegas Stadium; Whitney, NV	L 8–33	15,418	
November 2	Western Illinois	Honolulu Stadium; Honolulu, HI	L 0–31	18,372	
November 9	San Jose State	Honolulu Stadium; Honolulu, HI (rivalry)	L 11–32	13,629	
November 16	Santa Clara	Honolulu Stadium; Honolulu, HI	L 3–9	14,064	
November 23	Fresno State^{†}	Honolulu Stadium; Honolulu, HI (rivalry)	W 21–7	10,628	
November 30	Rutgers	Honolulu Stadium; Honolulu, HI	W 28–16	16,308	
December 7	Arizona State	Honolulu Stadium; Honolulu, HI	L 3–26	23,000	
^{†}Homecoming; Rankings from AP Poll released prior to the game
