= 1974 Southern Illinois Salukis football team =

American college football season

1974 Southern Illinois Salukis football
- Conference: Independent
- Record: 2–9
- Head coach: Doug Weaver (1st season)
- Home stadium: McAndrew Stadium

1974 NCAA Division I independents football records
	Conf.			Overall
Team	W	L	T	W		L		T
No. 6 Notre Dame		–		10	–	2	–	0
No. 7 Penn State		–		10	–	2	–	0
Temple		–		8	–	2	–	0
Boston College		–		8	–	3	–	0
Utah State		–		8	–	3	–	0
No. 19 Houston		–		8	–	3	–	1
Rutgers		–		7	–	3	–	1
Cincinnati		–		7	–	4	–	0
Memphis State		–		7	–	4	–	0
Pittsburgh		–		7	–	4	–	0
Georgia Tech		–		6	–	5	–	0
Hawaii		–		6	–	5	–	0
Miami (FL)		–		6	–	5	–	0
Southern Miss		–		6	–	5	–	0
Tampa		–		6	–	5	–	0
Holy Cross		–		5	–	5	–	1
Tulane		–		5	–	6	–	0
Colgate		–		4	–	6	–	0
Northern Illinois		–		4	–	7	–	0
Navy		–		4	–	7	–	0
South Carolina		–		4	–	7	–	0
Virginia Tech		–		4	–	7	–	0
West Virginia		–		4	–	7	–	0
Army		–		3	–	8	–	0
Dayton		–		3	–	8	–	0
Villanova		–		3	–	8	–	0
Air Force		–		2	–	9	–	0
Southern Illinois		–		2	–	9	–	0
Syracuse		–		2	–	9	–	0
Florida State		–		1	–	10	–	0
Marshall		–		1	–	10	–	0
Rankings from AP Poll

The 1974 Southern Illinois Salukis football team was an American football team that represented Southern Illinois University (now known as Southern Illinois University Carbondale) as an independent during the 1974 NCAA Division I football season. Under first-year head coach Doug Weaver, the team compiled a 2–9 record. The team played its home games at McAndrew Stadium in Carbondale, Illinois.

== Schedule ==
Date	Opponent	Site	Result	Attendance	Source
September 14	at New Mexico State	Memorial Stadium; Las Cruces, NM	L 9–28	11,520	
September 21	at Indiana State	Memorial Stadium; Terre Haute, IN	L 8–10	7,226	
September 28	at East Carolina	Ficklen Memorial Stadium; Greenville, NC	L 16–17	15,525	
October 5	at Dayton	Welcome Stadium; Dayton, OH	W 38–16	9,124	
October 12	at Temple	Temple Stadium; Philadelphia, PA	L 16–59	8,723	
October 19	Northern Illinois	McAndrew Stadium; Carbondale, IL	L 7–17	5,000	
October 26	Arkansas State	McAndrew Stadium; Carbondale, IL	L 16–41		
November 2	at Long Beach State	Veterans Memorial Stadium; Long Beach, CA	L 7–32	6,084	
November 9	Northern Michigan	McAndrew Stadium; Carbondale, IL	W 14–9	3,103	
November 16	at Central Michigan	Perry Shorts Stadium; Mount Pleasant, MI	L 0–42	12,830	
November 23	Illinois State	McAndrew Stadium; Carbondale, IL	L 16–31	1,203	
