= 1974 West Virginia Mountaineers football team =

American college football season

1974 West Virginia Mountaineers football
- Conference: Independent
- Record: 4–7
- Head coach: Bobby Bowden (5th season)
- Home stadium: Mountaineer Field

1974 NCAA Division I independents football records
	Conf.			Overall
Team	W	L	T	W		L		T
No. 6 Notre Dame		–		10	–	2	–	0
No. 7 Penn State		–		10	–	2	–	0
Temple		–		8	–	2	–	0
Boston College		–		8	–	3	–	0
Utah State		–		8	–	3	–	0
No. 19 Houston		–		8	–	3	–	1
Rutgers		–		7	–	3	–	1
Cincinnati		–		7	–	4	–	0
Memphis State		–		7	–	4	–	0
Pittsburgh		–		7	–	4	–	0
Georgia Tech		–		6	–	5	–	0
Hawaii		–		6	–	5	–	0
Miami (FL)		–		6	–	5	–	0
Southern Miss		–		6	–	5	–	0
Tampa		–		6	–	5	–	0
Holy Cross		–		5	–	5	–	1
Tulane		–		5	–	6	–	0
Colgate		–		4	–	6	–	0
Northern Illinois		–		4	–	7	–	0
Navy		–		4	–	7	–	0
South Carolina		–		4	–	7	–	0
Virginia Tech		–		4	–	7	–	0
West Virginia		–		4	–	7	–	0
Army		–		3	–	8	–	0
Dayton		–		3	–	8	–	0
Villanova		–		3	–	8	–	0
Air Force		–		2	–	9	–	0
Southern Illinois		–		2	–	9	–	0
Syracuse		–		2	–	9	–	0
Florida State		–		1	–	10	–	0
Marshall		–		1	–	10	–	0
Rankings from AP Poll

The 1974 West Virginia Mountaineers football team represented West Virginia University in the 1974 NCAA Division I football season. It was the Mountaineers' 82nd overall season and they competed as an independent. The team was led by head coach Bobby Bowden, in his fifth year, and played their home games at Mountaineer Field in Morgantown, West Virginia. They finished the season with a record of 4–7.

== Schedule ==
Date	Opponent	Site	Result	Attendance	Source
September 14	Richmond	Mountaineer Field; Morgantown, WV	L 25–29	29,750	
September 21	Kentucky	Mountaineer Field; Morgantown, WV	W 16–3	28,200	
September 28	at Tulane	Tulane Stadium; New Orleans, LA	L 14–17	31,647	
October 5	at Indiana	Memorial Stadium; Bloomington, IN	W 24–0	30,153	
October 12	at Pittsburgh	Pitt Stadium; Pittsburgh, PA (rivalry)	L 14–31	43,143	
October 19	Miami (FL)^{†}	Mountaineer Field; Morgantown, WV	L 20–21	32,800	
October 26	No. 10 Penn State	Mountaineer Field; Morgantown, WV (rivalry)	L 12–21	34,500	
November 2	at Boston College	Alumni Stadium; Chestnut Hill, MA	L 3–35	19,062	
November 9	Syracuse	Mountaineer Field; Morgantown, WV (rivalry)	W 39–11	24,200	
November 16	Temple	Mountaineer Field; Morgantown, WV	L 21–35	23,900	
November 23	at Virginia Tech	Lane Stadium; Blacksburg, VA (rivalry)	W 22–21	36,000	
^{†}Homecoming; Rankings from AP Poll released prior to the game

== Roster ==
1974 West Virginia Mountaineers football team roster
Players			Coaches
Offense: Pos. / # / Name / Class; WR / 8 / Danny Buggs / Sr	Defense: Pos. / # / Name / Class; DT / 90 / Jeff Merrow / Sr	Special teams: Pos. / # / Name / Class	Head coach: Bobby Bowden; Coordinators/assistant coaches Legend: (C) Team captain; (S) Suspended; (I) Ineligible; Injured; Redshirt
