= 1974 Miami Hurricanes football team =

American college football season

1974 Miami Hurricanes football
- Conference: Independent
- Record: 6–5
- Head coach: Pete Elliott (2nd season)
- Offensive coordinator: Carl Selmer (3rd season)
- MVP: Rich Griffiths
- Home stadium: Miami Orange Bowl

1974 NCAA Division I independents football records
	Conf.			Overall
Team	W	L	T	W		L		T
No. 6 Notre Dame		–		10	–	2	–	0
No. 7 Penn State		–		10	–	2	–	0
Temple		–		8	–	2	–	0
Boston College		–		8	–	3	–	0
Utah State		–		8	–	3	–	0
No. 19 Houston		–		8	–	3	–	1
Rutgers		–		7	–	3	–	1
Cincinnati		–		7	–	4	–	0
Memphis State		–		7	–	4	–	0
Pittsburgh		–		7	–	4	–	0
Georgia Tech		–		6	–	5	–	0
Hawaii		–		6	–	5	–	0
Miami (FL)		–		6	–	5	–	0
Southern Miss		–		6	–	5	–	0
Tampa		–		6	–	5	–	0
Holy Cross		–		5	–	5	–	1
Tulane		–		5	–	6	–	0
Colgate		–		4	–	6	–	0
Northern Illinois		–		4	–	7	–	0
Navy		–		4	–	7	–	0
South Carolina		–		4	–	7	–	0
Virginia Tech		–		4	–	7	–	0
West Virginia		–		4	–	7	–	0
Army		–		3	–	8	–	0
Dayton		–		3	–	8	–	0
Villanova		–		3	–	8	–	0
Air Force		–		2	–	9	–	0
Southern Illinois		–		2	–	9	–	0
Syracuse		–		2	–	9	–	0
Florida State		–		1	–	10	–	0
Marshall		–		1	–	10	–	0
Rankings from AP Poll

The 1974 Miami Hurricanes football team represented the University of Miami as an independent during the 1974 NCAA Division I football season. Led by Pete Elliott in his second and final year as head coach, the Hurricanes played their home games at the Miami Orange Bowl in Miami, Florida. Miami finished the season with a record of 6–5.

== Schedule ==
Date	Opponent	Rank	Site	TV	Result	Attendance	Source
September 21	at No. 19 Houston		Jeppesen Stadium; Houston, TX		W 20–3	18,767	
September 28	at Tampa	No. 20	Tampa Stadium; Tampa, FL		W 28–26	40,627	
October 4	No. 11 Auburn	No. 16	Miami Orange Bowl; Miami, FL		L 0–3	33,490	
October 11	Pacific (CA)		Miami Orange Bowl; Miami, FL		W 35–6	15,184	
October 19	at West Virginia		Mountaineer Field; Morgantown, WV		W 21–20	32,800	
October 26	at No. 7 Notre Dame		Notre Dame Stadium; Notre Dame, IN (rivalry)	ABC	L 7–38	59,075	
November 1	Virginia Tech		Miami Orange Bowl; Miami, FL (rivalry)		W 14–7	20,134	
November 8	Florida State		Miami Orange Bowl; Miami, FL (rivalry)		L 14–21	19,785	
November 16	No. 2 Alabama		Miami Orange Bowl; Miami, FL		L 7–28	26,265	
November 22	Syracuse		Miami Orange Bowl; Miami, FL		W 14–7	12,208	
November 30	at Florida		Florida Field; Gainesville, FL (rivalry)		L 7–31	48,563	
Rankings from AP Poll released prior to the game

== Roster ==
- DB Mike Archer
- WR Rick Bernstein
