= 1974 Pittsburgh Panthers football team =

American college football season

1974 Pittsburgh Panthers football
- Conference: Independent
- Record: 7–4
- Head coach: Johnny Majors (2nd season)
- Offensive coordinator: George Haffner (2nd season)
- Offensive scheme: I formation with variations
- Defensive coordinator: Jackie Sherrill (2nd season)
- Base defense: 5–3
- Home stadium: Pitt Stadium; Three Rivers Stadium

1974 NCAA Division I independents football records
	Conf.			Overall
Team	W	L	T	W		L		T
No. 6 Notre Dame		–		10	–	2	–	0
No. 7 Penn State		–		10	–	2	–	0
Temple		–		8	–	2	–	0
Boston College		–		8	–	3	–	0
Utah State		–		8	–	3	–	0
No. 19 Houston		–		8	–	3	–	1
Rutgers		–		7	–	3	–	1
Cincinnati		–		7	–	4	–	0
Memphis State		–		7	–	4	–	0
Pittsburgh		–		7	–	4	–	0
Georgia Tech		–		6	–	5	–	0
Hawaii		–		6	–	5	–	0
Miami (FL)		–		6	–	5	–	0
Southern Miss		–		6	–	5	–	0
Tampa		–		6	–	5	–	0
Holy Cross		–		5	–	5	–	1
Tulane		–		5	–	6	–	0
Colgate		–		4	–	6	–	0
Northern Illinois		–		4	–	7	–	0
Navy		–		4	–	7	–	0
South Carolina		–		4	–	7	–	0
Virginia Tech		–		4	–	7	–	0
West Virginia		–		4	–	7	–	0
Army		–		3	–	8	–	0
Dayton		–		3	–	8	–	0
Villanova		–		3	–	8	–	0
Air Force		–		2	–	9	–	0
Southern Illinois		–		2	–	9	–	0
Syracuse		–		2	–	9	–	0
Florida State		–		1	–	10	–	0
Marshall		–		1	–	10	–	0
Rankings from AP Poll

The 1974 Pittsburgh Panthers football team represented the University of Pittsburgh as an independent during the 1974 NCAA Division I football season. Led by second-year head coach Johnny Majors, the Panthers compiled a record of 7–4. The team played home games at Pitt Stadium and Three Rivers Stadium in Pittsburgh.

== Schedule ==
Date	Opponent	Rank	Site	TV	Result	Attendance	Source
September 14	at Florida State	No. 13	Doak Campbell Stadium; Tallahassee, FL		W 9–6	30,076	
September 21	at Georgia Tech	No. 15	Grant Field; Atlanta, GA		W 27–17	37,361	
September 28	No. 18 USC	No. 8	Pitt Stadium; Pittsburgh, PA		L 7–16	52,934	
October 5	at North Carolina	No. 17	Kenan Memorial Stadium; Chapel Hill, NC		L 29–45	44,800	
October 12	West Virginia		Pitt Stadium; Pittsburgh, PA (Backyard Brawl)		W 31–14	43,143	
October 19	Boston College		Pitt Stadium; Pittsburgh, PA		W 35–11	32,149	
October 26	at Navy		Navy–Marine Corps Memorial Stadium; Annapolis, MD		W 33–11	24,820	
November 2	at Syracuse		Archbold Stadium; Syracuse, NY (rivalry)		W 21–13	25,177	
November 9	Temple	No. 19	Pitt Stadium; Pittsburgh, PA		W 35–24	42,708	
November 16	at No. 5 Notre Dame	No. 17	Notre Dame Stadium; Notre Dame, IN (rivalry)		L 10–14	59,075	
November 28	No. 10 Penn State	No. 18	Three Rivers Stadium; Pittsburgh, PA (rivalry)	ABC	L 10–31	45,895	
Rankings from AP Poll released prior to the game

== Roster ==
1974 Pittsburgh Panthers football team roster
Players
Coaches
Offense

Pos.	#	Name	Class
TE	81	James Corbett	So
RB	33	Tony Dorsett	So

Defense

Pos.	#	Name	Class
DT		Gary Burley	So
DE	60	Cecil Johnson	So
DE	85	Tom Perko	Jr
DE	91	Al Romano	So

Special teams

Pos.	#	Name	Class
P	41	Larry Swider	So

Head coach

- Johnny Majors

Coordinators/assistant coaches

Legend

- (C) Team captain
- (S) Suspended
- (I) Ineligible
- Injured
- Redshirt

== Coaching staff ==
1974 Pittsburgh Panthers football staff
Coaching staff: Johnny Majors – Head coach; Jackie Sherrill – Assistant head coach/defensive coordinator; George Haffner – Offensive coordinator; Joe Avezzano – Offensive line; Jim Dyar – Defensive line; Larry Holton – Defensive assistant; Harry Jones – Offensive backs; Bob Leahy – Junior Varsity Coach; Joe Madden – Defensive secondary; Bob Roper – Receivers; Bob Matey – Junior Varsity Assistant; Keith Schroeder – Scouting	Support staff: Albert Smith – Executive Assistant Director of Athletics; Henry Lee Parker – Coordinator of Recruiting	Strength and conditioning staff

== Team players drafted into the NFL ==
Player	Position	Round	Pick	NFL club
Gary Burley	Defensive end	3	55	Cincinnati Bengals
Mike Bulino	Defensive back	17	424	Kansas City Chiefs
