= 1974 Rutgers Scarlet Knights football team =

American college football season

1974 Rutgers Scarlet Knights football
- Conference: Independent
- Record: 7–3–1
- Head coach: Frank R. Burns (2nd season)
- Captains: Anthony Pawlik; Andrew Zdobylak
- Home stadium: Rutgers Stadium

1974 NCAA Division I independents football records
	Conf.			Overall
Team	W	L	T	W		L		T
No. 6 Notre Dame		–		10	–	2	–	0
No. 7 Penn State		–		10	–	2	–	0
Temple		–		8	–	2	–	0
Boston College		–		8	–	3	–	0
Utah State		–		8	–	3	–	0
No. 19 Houston		–		8	–	3	–	1
Rutgers		–		7	–	3	–	1
Cincinnati		–		7	–	4	–	0
Memphis State		–		7	–	4	–	0
Pittsburgh		–		7	–	4	–	0
Georgia Tech		–		6	–	5	–	0
Hawaii		–		6	–	5	–	0
Miami (FL)		–		6	–	5	–	0
Southern Miss		–		6	–	5	–	0
Tampa		–		6	–	5	–	0
Holy Cross		–		5	–	5	–	1
Tulane		–		5	–	6	–	0
Colgate		–		4	–	6	–	0
Northern Illinois		–		4	–	7	–	0
Navy		–		4	–	7	–	0
South Carolina		–		4	–	7	–	0
Virginia Tech		–		4	–	7	–	0
West Virginia		–		4	–	7	–	0
Army		–		3	–	8	–	0
Dayton		–		3	–	8	–	0
Villanova		–		3	–	8	–	0
Air Force		–		2	–	9	–	0
Southern Illinois		–		2	–	9	–	0
Syracuse		–		2	–	9	–	0
Florida State		–		1	–	10	–	0
Marshall		–		1	–	10	–	0
Rankings from AP Poll

The 1974 Rutgers Scarlet Knights football team represented Rutgers University as an independent during the 1974 NCAA Division I football season. In their second season under head coach Frank R. Burns, the Scarlet Knights compiled a 7–3–1 record. Rutgers outscored opponents 244 to 146. The team's statistical leaders included Bret Kosup with 1,070 passing yards, Curt Edwards with 889 rushing yards, and Mark Twitty with 314 receiving yards.

The Scarlet Knights played their home games at Rutgers Stadium in Piscataway, New Jersey, across the river from the university's main campus in New Brunswick, New Jersey.

== Schedule ==
Date	Opponent	Site	Result	Attendance	Source
September 21	at Bucknell	Memorial Stadium; Lewisburg, PA	W 16–14	4,500	
September 28	at Princeton	Palmer Stadium; Princeton, NJ (rivalry)	T 6–6	26,000	
October 5	at Harvard	Harvard Stadium; Boston, MA	W 24–21	11,000	
October 12	Lehigh^{†}	Rutgers Stadium; Piscataway, NJ	W 37–16	17,500	
October 19	at William & Mary	Cary Field; Williamsburg, VA	L 15–28	13,000	
October 26	Air Force	Rutgers Stadium; Piscataway, NJ	W 20–3	18,000	
November 2	Connecticut	Rutgers Stadium; Piscataway, NJ	L 7–9	12,500	
November 9	at Lafayette	Fisher Field; Easton, PA	W 35–0	7,500	
November 16	Boston University	Rutgers Stadium; Piscataway, NJ	W 6–0	13,500	
November 23	Colgate	Rutgers Stadium; Piscataway, NJ	W 62–21	11,000	
November 30	at Hawaii	Honolulu Stadium; Honolulu, HI	L 16–28	16,308	
^{†}Homecoming

== Roster ==
1974 Rutgers Scarlet Knights football team roster
Players
Coaches
Offense

Pos.	#	Name	Class

Defense

Pos.	#	Name	Class
DT	70	John Alexander	So
S	21	Ed Jones	Sr
FS	16	Tony Pawlik	Sr

Special teams

Pos.	#	Name	Class

Head coach

- Frank R. Burns

Coordinators/assistant coaches

Legend

- (C) Team captain
- (S) Suspended
- (I) Ineligible
- Injured
- Redshirt
