= 1974 Southern Miss Golden Eagles football team =

American college football season

1974 Southern Miss Golden Eagles football
- Conference: Independent
- Record: 6–5
- Head coach: P. W. Underwood (6th season)
- Home stadium: Ladd Stadium; Mississippi Veterans Memorial Stadium

1974 NCAA Division I independents football records
	Conf.			Overall
Team	W	L	T	W		L		T
No. 6 Notre Dame		–		10	–	2	–	0
No. 7 Penn State		–		10	–	2	–	0
Temple		–		8	–	2	–	0
Boston College		–		8	–	3	–	0
Utah State		–		8	–	3	–	0
No. 19 Houston		–		8	–	3	–	1
Rutgers		–		7	–	3	–	1
Cincinnati		–		7	–	4	–	0
Memphis State		–		7	–	4	–	0
Pittsburgh		–		7	–	4	–	0
Georgia Tech		–		6	–	5	–	0
Hawaii		–		6	–	5	–	0
Miami (FL)		–		6	–	5	–	0
Southern Miss		–		6	–	5	–	0
Tampa		–		6	–	5	–	0
Holy Cross		–		5	–	5	–	1
Tulane		–		5	–	6	–	0
Colgate		–		4	–	6	–	0
Northern Illinois		–		4	–	7	–	0
Navy		–		4	–	7	–	0
South Carolina		–		4	–	7	–	0
Virginia Tech		–		4	–	7	–	0
West Virginia		–		4	–	7	–	0
Army		–		3	–	8	–	0
Dayton		–		3	–	8	–	0
Villanova		–		3	–	8	–	0
Air Force		–		2	–	9	–	0
Southern Illinois		–		2	–	9	–	0
Syracuse		–		2	–	9	–	0
Florida State		–		1	–	10	–	0
Marshall		–		1	–	10	–	0
Rankings from AP Poll

The 1974 Southern Miss Golden Eagles football team was an American football team that represented the University of Southern Mississippi as an independent during the 1974 NCAA Division I football season. In their sixth year under head coach P. W. Underwood, the team compiled a 6–5 record.

== Schedule ==
Date	Opponent	Site	Result	Attendance	Source
September 14	at Memphis State	Memphis Memorial Stadium; Memphis, TN (rivalry)	W 6–0	26,608	
September 21	at No. 5 Alabama	Legion Field; Birmingham, AL	L 0–52	62,000	
September 28	at Ole Miss	Hemingway Stadium; Oxford, MS	L 14–20	29,000	
October 5	at West Texas State	Kimbrough Memorial Stadium; Canyon, TX	L 0–31	5,074	
October 12	UT Arlington	Mississippi Veterans Memorial Stadium; Jackson, MS	W 39–10	4,025	
October 19	VMI	Ladd Stadium; Mobile, AL	W 15–14	5,074	
October 26	at Lamar	Cardinal Stadium; Beaumont, TX	L 7–10	14,106	
November 2	at Southwestern Louisiana	Cajun Field; Lafayette, LA	W 41–7	10,360	
November 9	at Utah State	Romney Stadium; Logan, UT	W 7–3	10,046	
November 16	Bowling Green	Ladd Stadium; Mobile, AL	L 20–38	3,571	
November 23	at Tampa	Tampa Stadium; Tampa, FL	W 11–10	14,837	
Rankings from AP Poll released prior to the game
