= 1974 Holy Cross Crusaders football team =

American college football season

1974 Holy Cross Crusaders football
- Conference: Independent
- Record: 5–5–1
- Head coach: Ed Doherty (4th season)
- Captains: John Provost; Mike Zywien
- Home stadium: Fitton Field

1974 NCAA Division I independents football records
	Conf.			Overall
Team	W	L	T	W		L		T
No. 6 Notre Dame		–		10	–	2	–	0
No. 7 Penn State		–		10	–	2	–	0
Temple		–		8	–	2	–	0
Boston College		–		8	–	3	–	0
Utah State		–		8	–	3	–	0
No. 19 Houston		–		8	–	3	–	1
Rutgers		–		7	–	3	–	1
Cincinnati		–		7	–	4	–	0
Memphis State		–		7	–	4	–	0
Pittsburgh		–		7	–	4	–	0
Georgia Tech		–		6	–	5	–	0
Hawaii		–		6	–	5	–	0
Miami (FL)		–		6	–	5	–	0
Southern Miss		–		6	–	5	–	0
Tampa		–		6	–	5	–	0
Holy Cross		–		5	–	5	–	1
Tulane		–		5	–	6	–	0
Colgate		–		4	–	6	–	0
Northern Illinois		–		4	–	7	–	0
Navy		–		4	–	7	–	0
South Carolina		–		4	–	7	–	0
Virginia Tech		–		4	–	7	–	0
West Virginia		–		4	–	7	–	0
Army		–		3	–	8	–	0
Dayton		–		3	–	8	–	0
Villanova		–		3	–	8	–	0
Air Force		–		2	–	9	–	0
Southern Illinois		–		2	–	9	–	0
Syracuse		–		2	–	9	–	0
Florida State		–		1	–	10	–	0
Marshall		–		1	–	10	–	0
Rankings from AP Poll

The 1974 Holy Cross Crusaders football team was an American football team that represented the College of the Holy Cross as an independent during the 1974 NCAA Division I football season. Ed Doherty returned for his fourth year as head coach. The team compiled a record of 5–5–1.

All home games were played at Fitton Field on the Holy Cross campus in Worcester, Massachusetts.

== Schedule ==
Date	Opponent	Site	Result	Attendance	Source
September 21	Brown	Fitton Field; Worcester, MA	W 45–10	12,500	
September 28	at Harvard	Harvard Stadium; Boston, MA	L 14–24	17,500	
October 5	Dartmouth^{†}	Fitton Field; Worcester, MA	W 14–3	18,000	
October 12	at Colgate	Andy Kerr Stadium; Hamilton, NY	L 16–21	7,000	
October 19	at Temple	Temple Stadium; Philadelphia, PA	L 0–56	12,555	
October 26	at Army	Michie Stadium; West Point, NY	L 10–13	39,893	
November 1	at Boston University	Nickerson Field; Boston, MA	T 14–14	5,454	
November 9	UMass^	Fitton Field; Worcester, MA	W 30–20	14,844	
November 16	at Villanova	Villanova Stadium; Villanova, PA	W 10–6	5,075	
November 23	Connecticut	Fitton Field; Worcester, MA	W 23–14	11,441	
November 30	at Boston College	Alumni Stadium; Chestnut Hill, MA (rivalry)	L 6–38	28,497	
^{†}Homecoming; ^ Family Weekend

== Statistical leaders ==
Statistical leaders for the 1974 Crusaders included:

- Rushing: Steve Hunt, 427 yards on 104 attempts
- Passing: Bob Morton, 1,077 yards, 101 completions and 8 touchdowns on 188 attempts
- Receiving: Dave Quehl, 801 yards and 6 touchdowns on 62 receptions
- Scoring: Jerry Kelley, 42 points from 21 PATs and 7 field goals
- Total offense: Bob Morton, 1,483 yards (1,077 passing, 406 rushing)
- All-purpose yards: Dave Quehl, 807 yards (801 receiving, 6 returning)
- Interceptions: John Provost, 10 interceptions for 157 yards
