= 1974 Temple Owls football team =

American college football season

1974 Temple Owls football
- Conference: Independent
- Record: 8–2
- Head coach: Wayne Hardin (5th season)
- Home stadium: Temple Stadium, Veterans Stadium

1974 NCAA Division I independents football records
	Conf.			Overall
Team	W	L	T	W		L		T
No. 6 Notre Dame		–		10	–	2	–	0
No. 7 Penn State		–		10	–	2	–	0
Temple		–		8	–	2	–	0
Boston College		–		8	–	3	–	0
Utah State		–		8	–	3	–	0
No. 19 Houston		–		8	–	3	–	1
Rutgers		–		7	–	3	–	1
Cincinnati		–		7	–	4	–	0
Memphis State		–		7	–	4	–	0
Pittsburgh		–		7	–	4	–	0
Georgia Tech		–		6	–	5	–	0
Hawaii		–		6	–	5	–	0
Miami (FL)		–		6	–	5	–	0
Southern Miss		–		6	–	5	–	0
Tampa		–		6	–	5	–	0
Holy Cross		–		5	–	5	–	1
Tulane		–		5	–	6	–	0
Colgate		–		4	–	6	–	0
Northern Illinois		–		4	–	7	–	0
Navy		–		4	–	7	–	0
South Carolina		–		4	–	7	–	0
Virginia Tech		–		4	–	7	–	0
West Virginia		–		4	–	7	–	0
Army		–		3	–	8	–	0
Dayton		–		3	–	8	–	0
Villanova		–		3	–	8	–	0
Air Force		–		2	–	9	–	0
Southern Illinois		–		2	–	9	–	0
Syracuse		–		2	–	9	–	0
Florida State		–		1	–	10	–	0
Marshall		–		1	–	10	–	0
Rankings from AP Poll

The 1974 Temple Owls football team was an American football team that represented Temple University as an independent during the 1974 NCAA Division I football season. In its fifth season under head coach Wayne Hardin, the team compiled an 8–2 record and outscored opponents by a total of 335 to 142. The team played its home games at Temple Stadium (four games) and Veterans Stadium (two games) in Philadelphia.

The team's statistical leaders included Steve Joachim with 1,950 passing yards, Henry Hynoski with 1,006 rushing yards, Pete Righi with 608 receiving yards, and Hynoski and Joachim with 54 points each.

== Schedule ==
Date	Opponent	Rank	Site	Result	Attendance	Source
September 14	at Rhode Island		Meade Stadium; Kingston, RI	W 38–7	4,812	
September 28	Boston College		Temple Stadium; Philadelphia, PA	W 34–7	12,282	
October 5	Marshall		Temple Stadium; Philadelphia, PA	W 31–10	10,417	
October 12	Southern Illinois		Temple Stadium; Philadelphia, PA	W 59–16	8,723	
October 19	Holy Cross		Temple Stadium; Philadelphia, PA	W 56–0	12,555	
October 26	No. 2 (small) Delaware		Veterans Stadium; Philadelphia, PA	W 21–17	37,156–37,265	
November 2	at Cincinnati	No. 19	Nippert Stadium; Cincinnati, OH	L 20–22	18,303	
November 9	at No. 19 Pittsburgh		Pitt Stadium; Pittsburgh, PA	L 24–35	42,708	
November 16	at West Virginia		Mountaineer Field; Morgantown, WV	W 35–21	23,900	
November 23	vs. Villanova		Veterans Stadium; Philadelphia, PA (Mayor's Cup)	W 17–7	17,085	
Rankings from AP Poll released prior to the game
