= 1974 New Mexico State Aggies football team =

American college football season

1974 New Mexico State Aggies football
- Conference: Missouri Valley Conference
- Record: 5–6 (2–3 MVC)
- Head coach: Jim Bradley (2nd season)
- Home stadium: Memorial Stadium

1974 Missouri Valley Conference football standings
| | Conf. | | | | | Overall |
| Team | W | | L | | T | W | | L | | T |
|---|---|---|---|---|---|---|---|---|---|---|
| Tulsa $ | 6 | – | 0 | – | 0 | 8 | – | 3 | – | 0 |
| Louisville | 3 | – | 2 | – | 0 | 4 | – | 7 | – | 0 |
| West Texas State | 3 | – | 3 | – | 0 | 6 | – | 5 | – | 0 |
| Drake | 2 | – | 3 | – | 1 | 3 | – | 7 | – | 1 |
| New Mexico State | 2 | – | 3 | – | 0 | 5 | – | 6 | – | 0 |
| North Texas State | 1 | – | 3 | – | 2 | 2 | – | 7 | – | 2 |
| Wichita State | 1 | – | 4 | – | 1 | 1 | – | 9 | – | 1 |
$ – Conference champion

The 1974 New Mexico State Aggies football team was an American football team that represented New Mexico State University in the Missouri Valley Conference during the 1974 NCAA Division I football season. In their second year under head coach Jim Bradley, the Aggies compiled a 5–6 record. The team played home games at Memorial Stadium in Las Cruces, New Mexico.

== Schedule ==
| Date | Opponent | Site | Result | Attendance | Source |
|---|---|---|---|---|---|
| September 7 | at Wichita State | Cessna Stadium; Wichita, KS | W 13–12 | 25,412 | |
| September 14 | Southern Illinois* | Memorial Stadium; Las Cruces, NM | W 28–9 | 11,520 | |
| September 21 | at West Texas State | Kimbrough Memorial Stadium; Canyon, TX | W 41–0 | 14,500 | |
| September 28 | UT Arlington* | Memorial Stadium; Las Cruces, NM | W 42–14 | 11,392 | |
| October 5 | Fresno State* | Memorial Stadium; Las Cruces, NM | L 7–9 | 10,833 | |
| October 12 | UTEP* | Memorial Stadium; Las Cruces, NM (rivalry) | W 14–13 | 14,500 | |
| October 19 | at North Texas State | Fouts Field; Denton, TX | L 19–24 | 12,800 | |
| October 26 | Drake | Memorial Stadium; Las Cruces, NM | L 28–29 | 12,006 | |
| November 2 | at New Mexico* | University Stadium; Albuquerque, NM (rivalry) | L 24–26 | 16,496 | |
| November 9 | at Tulsa | Skelly Stadium; Tulsa, OK | L 7–28 | 10,000 | |
| November 16 | at San Diego State* | San Diego Stadium; San Diego, CA | L 14–35 | 26,722 | |
*Non-conference game
