= 1974 Florida State Seminoles football team =

American college football season

1974 Florida State Seminoles football
- Conference: Independent
- Record: 1–10
- Head coach: Darrell Mudra (1st season)
- Offensive coordinator: Dan Henning (1st season)
- Defensive coordinator: Pete Rodriguez (1st season)
- Captains: Joe Goldsmith; Bert Cooper
- Home stadium: Doak Campbell Stadium

1974 NCAA Division I independents football records
	Conf.			Overall
Team	W	L	T	W		L		T
No. 6 Notre Dame		–		10	–	2	–	0
No. 7 Penn State		–		10	–	2	–	0
Temple		–		8	–	2	–	0
Boston College		–		8	–	3	–	0
Utah State		–		8	–	3	–	0
No. 19 Houston		–		8	–	3	–	1
Rutgers		–		7	–	3	–	1
Cincinnati		–		7	–	4	–	0
Memphis State		–		7	–	4	–	0
Pittsburgh		–		7	–	4	–	0
Georgia Tech		–		6	–	5	–	0
Hawaii		–		6	–	5	–	0
Miami (FL)		–		6	–	5	–	0
Southern Miss		–		6	–	5	–	0
Tampa		–		6	–	5	–	0
Holy Cross		–		5	–	5	–	1
Tulane		–		5	–	6	–	0
Colgate		–		4	–	6	–	0
Northern Illinois		–		4	–	7	–	0
Navy		–		4	–	7	–	0
South Carolina		–		4	–	7	–	0
Virginia Tech		–		4	–	7	–	0
West Virginia		–		4	–	7	–	0
Army		–		3	–	8	–	0
Dayton		–		3	–	8	–	0
Villanova		–		3	–	8	–	0
Air Force		–		2	–	9	–	0
Southern Illinois		–		2	–	9	–	0
Syracuse		–		2	–	9	–	0
Florida State		–		1	–	10	–	0
Marshall		–		1	–	10	–	0
Rankings from AP Poll

The 1974 Florida State Seminoles football team represented Florida State University as an independent during the 1974 NCAA Division I football season. Led by head coach Darrell Mudra in his first season, the Seminoles finished the season with a record of 1–10.

== Schedule ==
Date	Opponent	Site	Result	Attendance	Source
September 14	No. 13 Pittsburgh	Doak Campbell Stadium; Tallahassee, FL	L 6–9	30,076	
September 21	Colorado State	Doak Campbell Stadium; Tallahassee, FL	L 7–14	30,984	
September 28	at Kansas	Memorial Stadium; Lawrence, KS	L 9–40	38,780	
October 5	Baylor	Doak Campbell Stadium; Tallahassee, FL	L 17–21	25,262	
October 12	at No. 3 Alabama	Denny Stadium; Tuscaloosa, AL	L 7–8	58,394	
October 19	No. 14 Florida	Doak Campbell Stadium; Tallahassee, FL (rivalry)	L 14–24	42,541	
October 26	at No. 5 Auburn	Jordan–Hare Stadium; Auburn. AL	L 6–38	58,709	
November 2	at Memphis State	Memphis Memorial Stadium; Memphis, TN	L 14–42	20,689	
November 8	at Miami (FL)	Miami Orange Bowl; Miami, FL (rivalry)	W 21–14	19,785	
November 16	Virginia Tech	Doak Campbell Stadium; Tallahassee, FL	L 21–56	27,707	
November 23	No. 15 Houston	Doak Campbell Stadium; Tallahassee, FL	L 8–23	18,195	
Rankings from AP Poll released prior to the game
