= 1974 Louisville Cardinals football team =

American college football season

1974 Louisville Cardinals football
- Conference: Missouri Valley Conference
- Record: 4–7 (3–2 MVC)
- Head coach: T. W. Alley (2nd season)
- Home stadium: Fairgrounds Stadium

1974 Missouri Valley Conference football standings
	Conf.					Overall
Team	W		L		T	W		L		T
Tulsa $	6	–	0	–	0	8	–	3	–	0
Louisville	3	–	2	–	0	4	–	7	–	0
West Texas State	3	–	3	–	0	6	–	5	–	0
Drake	2	–	3	–	1	3	–	7	–	1
New Mexico State	2	–	3	–	0	5	–	6	–	0
North Texas State	1	–	3	–	2	2	–	7	–	2
Wichita State	1	–	4	–	1	1	–	9	–	1
$ – Conference champion

The 1974 Louisville Cardinals football team represented the University of Louisville in the 1974 NCAA Division I football season. The team played their home games in Cardinal Stadium and was led by T. W. Alley in his second and final year as head coach.

== Schedule ==
Date	Opponent	Site	Result	Attendance	Source
September 7	Memphis State*	Fairgrounds Stadium; Louisville, KY (rivalry)	L 0–16	20,634	
September 14	at Auburn*	Legion Field; Birmingham, AL	L 3–16	25,000	
September 28	at Cincinnati*	Nippert Stadium; Cincinnati, OH (The Keg of Nails)	L 6–7	14,484	
October 5	at Wichita State	Cessna Stadium; Wichita, KS	W 14–7	15,903	
October 12	at North Texas State	Fouts Field; Denton, TX	W 24–10	5,300	
October 19	Drake	Fairgrounds Stadium; Louisville, KY	L 35–38	11,443	
October 26	at Mississippi State*	Scott Field; Starkville, MS	L 7–56	35,000	
November 2	Tulsa	Fairgrounds Stadium; Louisville, KY	L 7–37	9,146	
November 9	at Dayton*	Welcome Stadium; Dayton, OH	W 20–15	6,250	
November 23	Vanderbilt*	Fairgrounds Stadium; Louisville, KY	L 0–44	8,936	
November 30	West Texas State	Fairgrounds Stadium; Louisville, KY	W 10–8	2,498	
*Non-conference game

== Team players in the NFL draft ==
Player	Position	Round	Pick	NFL club
A.J. Jacobs	Defensive Back	13	332	Los Angeles Rams
Marty Smith	Defensive Tackle	15	390	Pittsburgh Steelers
