= 1974 Army Cadets football team =

American college football season

1974 Army Cadets football
- Conference: Independent
- Record: 3–8
- Head coach: Homer Smith (1st season)
- Offensive coordinator: Frank Gansz (1st season)
- Captain: Bob Johnson
- Home stadium: Michie Stadium

1974 NCAA Division I independents football records
	Conf.			Overall
Team	W	L	T	W		L		T
No. 6 Notre Dame		–		10	–	2	–	0
No. 7 Penn State		–		10	–	2	–	0
Temple		–		8	–	2	–	0
Boston College		–		8	–	3	–	0
Utah State		–		8	–	3	–	0
No. 19 Houston		–		8	–	3	–	1
Rutgers		–		7	–	3	–	1
Cincinnati		–		7	–	4	–	0
Memphis State		–		7	–	4	–	0
Pittsburgh		–		7	–	4	–	0
Georgia Tech		–		6	–	5	–	0
Hawaii		–		6	–	5	–	0
Miami (FL)		–		6	–	5	–	0
Southern Miss		–		6	–	5	–	0
Tampa		–		6	–	5	–	0
Holy Cross		–		5	–	5	–	1
Tulane		–		5	–	6	–	0
Colgate		–		4	–	6	–	0
Northern Illinois		–		4	–	7	–	0
Navy		–		4	–	7	–	0
South Carolina		–		4	–	7	–	0
Virginia Tech		–		4	–	7	–	0
West Virginia		–		4	–	7	–	0
Army		–		3	–	8	–	0
Dayton		–		3	–	8	–	0
Villanova		–		3	–	8	–	0
Air Force		–		2	–	9	–	0
Southern Illinois		–		2	–	9	–	0
Syracuse		–		2	–	9	–	0
Florida State		–		1	–	10	–	0
Marshall		–		1	–	10	–	0
Rankings from AP Poll

The 1974 Army Cadets football team represented the United States Military Academy as an independent during the 1974 NCAA Division I football season. In their first year under head coach Homer Smith, the Cadets compiled a 3–8 record and were outscored by their opponents by a combined total of 306 to 156. In the annual Army–Navy Game, the Cadets lost to the Midshipmen by a 19 to 0 score.

No Army players were selected as first-team players on the 1974 College Football All-America Team.

== Schedule ==
Date	Opponent	Site	Result	Attendance	Source
September 14	Lafayette	Michie Stadium; West Point, NY	W 14–7	26,838–27,000	
September 21	Tulane	Michie Stadium; West Point, NY	L 14–31	30,279	
September 28	at California	California Memorial Stadium; Berkeley, CA	L 14–27	22,470	
October 5	Penn State	Michie Stadium; West Point, NY	L 14–21	41,221	
October 12	at Duke	Wallace Wade Stadium; Durham, NC	L 14–33	28,500	
October 19	at Notre Dame	Notre Dame Stadium; Notre Dame, IN (rivalry)	L 0–48	59,075	
October 26	Holy Cross	Michie Stadium; West Point, NY	W 13–10	39,893	
November 2	Vanderbilt	Michie Stadium; West Point, NY	L 14–38	30,109	
November 9	Air Force	Michie Stadium; West Point, NY (Commander-in-Chief's Trophy)	W 17–16	42,521	
November 16	at North Carolina	Kenan Memorial Stadium; Chapel Hill, NC	L 42–56	38,900	
November 30	vs. Navy	John F. Kennedy Stadium; Philadelphia, PA (Army–Navy Game)	L 0–19	83,247	

== Game summaries ==
=== Lafayette ===
External videos
- Army highlights

=== vs Navy ===
Army Cadets (3–7) vs. Navy Midshipmen (3–7)

Quarter	1	2	3	4	Total
Army	0	0	0	0	0
Navy	10	7	2	0	19

at JFK Stadium, Philadelphia, Pennsylvania

- Date: November 30, 1974
- Game attendance: 83,246
- TV announcers (ABC): Chris Schenkel and Ben Martin

Game information

First quarter

- NAVY – Steve Dykes 45-yard field goal. Navy 3–0.
- NAVY – Bob Jackson 3-yard run (Steve Dykes kick). Navy 10–0. Drive: 4 plays.

Second quarter

- NAVY – Bob Jackson 6-yard run (Steve Dykes kick), 9:32. Navy 17–0. Drive: 7 plays, 65 yards.

Third quarter

- NAVY – Safety, Scott Gillogly tackled by Tim Harden in end zone. Navy 19–0.

Fourth quarter

- No scoring

Top rushers

- NAVY – Cleveland Cooper – 105 yards

75th meeting; President Gerald Ford in attendance

External videos
- Full game
- Game highlights

== Roster ==
1974 Army Cadets football team roster
Players
Coaches
Offense

Pos.	#	Name	Class
OL		Jerry Araneo
OL		Neil Begley
OL		Bob Caslen
TE		Tony Dailey
RB		Brad Dodrill
OL		John Gallagher
QB		Scott Gillogly
QB		Leamon Hall	Fr
RB		Marcus Hardy
WR		John Hodges
TE		Jeff Jancek
OL		Ken Liepold
OL		Ken Lucas
OL		Brett Moritz
RB		Bob Simons
RB		Dan Spangler
RB		Willie Thigpen
WR		Howard Williams

Defense

Pos.	#	Name	Class
DL		Chuck Baker
DL		Ray Beverley
LB		Jeff Bruckner
DB		Joe Clancy
DL		Sal Colatard
DL		Rick Conniff
LB		Dave Duncavage
LB		Greg Dyson
DL		Stan Ford
DB		Vance Herrell
DB		Gary May
DB		Steve Mellich
DL		Mark Smith
DB		Al Staerkel
DB		Al Stuhlmiller

Special teams

Pos.	#	Name	Class

Head coach

- Homer Smith

Coordinators/assistant coaches

- Frank Gansz (OC)

Legend

- (C) Team captain
- (S) Suspended
- (I) Ineligible
- Injured
- Redshirt

- Not listed (missing number/class/position): Gary Smithey
