= 1974 Drake Bulldogs football team =

American college football season

1974 Drake Bulldogs football
- Conference: Missouri Valley Conference
- Record: 3–7–1 (2–3–1 MVC)
- Head coach: Jack Wallace (10th season)
- Home stadium: Drake Stadium

1974 Missouri Valley Conference football standings
	Conf.					Overall
Team	W		L		T	W		L		T
Tulsa $	6	–	0	–	0	8	–	3	–	0
Louisville	3	–	2	–	0	4	–	7	–	0
West Texas State	3	–	3	–	0	6	–	5	–	0
Drake	2	–	3	–	1	3	–	7	–	1
New Mexico State	2	–	3	–	0	5	–	6	–	0
North Texas State	1	–	3	–	2	2	–	7	–	2
Wichita State	1	–	4	–	1	1	–	9	–	1
$ – Conference champion

The 1974 Drake Bulldogs football team represented Drake University as a member of the Missouri Valley Conference (MVC) during the 1974 NCAA Division I football season. Led by Jack Wallace in his 10th season as head coach, the Bulldogs compiled an overall record of 3–7–1 with a mark of 2–3–1 in conference play, finished fourth in the MVC, and were oustscored by a total of 315 to 213.

On offense, the Bulldogs gained an average of 193.1 rushing yards and 146.4 passing yards per game. On defense, they gave up an average of 267.3 rushing yards and 168.2 passing yards per game. The team's leading rushers were running backs Jim O'Connor (1,031 yards, 4.3 yards per carry, 60 points scored) and Jim Herndon (679 yards, 6.1 yards per carry, 36 points scored). The passing game was led by quarterbacks Jeff Martin (723 passing yards, 111.7 passer rating) and Jonas Sears (711 passing yards, 88.1 passer rating). The team's leading receivers were wide receiver Mike Murphy (41 receptions for 638 yards) and tight end Hal Proppe (20 receptions for 310 yards).

Drake played home games at Drake Stadium in Des Moines, Iowa.

== Schedule ==
Date	Opponent	Site	Result	Attendance	Source
September 7	Dayton*	Drake Stadium; Des Moines, IA	L 7–21	20,500	
September 14	West Texas State	Drake Stadium; Des Moines, IA	L 17–37	13,400	
September 21	at Lamar*	Cardinal Stadium; Beaumont, TX	L 6–18	16,278	
September 28	at Long Beach State*	Veterans Memorial Stadium; Long Beach, CA	L 13–20	4,778	
October 5	North Texas State	Drake Stadium; Des Moines, IA	T 24–24	8,400	
October 12	at Northern Iowa*	O. R. Latham Stadium; Cedar Falls, IA	L 17–41	8,500–8,549	
October 19	at Louisville	Fairgrounds Stadium; Louisville, KY	W 38–35	11,443	
October 26	at New Mexico State	Memorial Stadium; Las Cruces, NM	W 29–28	12,006	
November 2	at Wichita State	Cessna Stadium; Wichita, KS	L 14–23	6,238	
November 9	Northern Arizona*	Drake Stadium; Des Moines, IA	W 34–16	5,800	
November 16	Tulsa	Drake Stadium; Des Moines, IA	L 14–52	7,650	
*Non-conference game
