= 1974 North Texas State Mean Green football team =

American college football season

1974 North Texas State Mean Green football
- Conference: Missouri Valley Conference
- Record: 2–7–2 (1–3–2 MVC)
- Head coach: Hayden Fry (2nd season)
- Home stadium: Fouts Field

1974 Missouri Valley Conference football standings
	Conf.					Overall
Team	W		L		T	W		L		T
Tulsa $	6	–	0	–	0	8	–	3	–	0
Louisville	3	–	2	–	0	4	–	7	–	0
West Texas State	3	–	3	–	0	6	–	5	–	0
Drake	2	–	3	–	1	3	–	7	–	1
New Mexico State	2	–	3	–	0	5	–	6	–	0
North Texas State	1	–	3	–	2	2	–	7	–	2
Wichita State	1	–	4	–	1	1	–	9	–	1
$ – Conference champion

The 1974 North Texas State Mean Green football team was an American football team that represented North Texas State University (now known as the University of North Texas) during the 1974 NCAA Division I football season as a member of the Missouri Valley Conference. In their second year under head coach Hayden Fry, the team compiled a 2–7–2 record.

== Schedule ==
Date	Opponent	Site	Result	Attendance	Source
September 14	vs. SMU*	Texas Stadium; Irving, TX (rivalry)	L 6–7	27,183	
September 21	at Tulsa	Skelly Stadium; Tulsa, OK	L 6–31	14,871–22,500	
September 28	Lamar*	Fouts Field; Denton, TX	L 7–27	11,200	
October 5	at Drake	Drake Stadium; Des Moines, IA	T 24–24	8,400	
October 12	Louisville	Fouts Field; Denton, TX	L 10–24	5,300	
October 19	New Mexico State^{†}	Fouts Field; Denton, TX	W 24–19	12,800	
October 26	Memphis State	Fouts Field; Denton, TX	L 0–41	5,700	
November 2	No. 20 San Diego State*	Fouts Field; Denton, TX	W 14–9	3,100	
November 9	at Wichita State	Cessna Stadium; Wichita, KS	T 10–10	8,724	
November 16	at West Texas State	Kimbrough Memorial Stadium; Canyon, TX	L 14–21	12,865	
November 23	Long Beach State*	Fouts Field; Denton, TX	L 19–35	2,500	
*Non-conference game; ^{†}Homecoming; Rankings from AP Poll released prior to the game
