= Tom Shuman =

American gridiron football player (born 1953)

Profile
- Position: Quarterback

Personal information
- Born: November 9, 1953 (age 72)

Career information
- High school: Pottstown (PA)
- College: Penn State

Career history
- 1975: Cincinnati Bengals*
- 1976–1977: Hamilton Tiger-Cats
- 1978: Montreal Alouettes
- 1978: Hamilton Tiger-Cats
- * Offseason or practice squad member only

Career statistics
- TD–INT: 5–13
- Passing yards: 1,253

Tom Shuman (born November 9, 1953) is an American former professional Canadian football quarterback in the Canadian Football League (CFL). He played for the Hamilton Tiger-Cats and Montreal Alouettes. He played college football at Penn State.

Shuman was the MVP of the 1974 Orange Bowl and 1975 Cotton Bowl Classic. He was drafted by the Cincinnati Bengals in the sixth round of the 1975 NFL draft, but was released before the season.

While at Penn State, Shuman was a Brother in Phi Gamma Delta along with Heisman Trophy Winner John Cappelletti.
