= 1974 Tulane Green Wave football team =

American college football season

1974 Tulane Green Wave football
- Conference: Independent
- Record: 5–6
- Head coach: Bennie Ellender (4th season)
- Home stadium: Tulane Stadium

1974 NCAA Division I independents football records
	Conf.			Overall
Team	W	L	T	W		L		T
No. 6 Notre Dame		–		10	–	2	–	0
No. 7 Penn State		–		10	–	2	–	0
Temple		–		8	–	2	–	0
Boston College		–		8	–	3	–	0
Utah State		–		8	–	3	–	0
No. 19 Houston		–		8	–	3	–	1
Rutgers		–		7	–	3	–	1
Cincinnati		–		7	–	4	–	0
Memphis State		–		7	–	4	–	0
Pittsburgh		–		7	–	4	–	0
Georgia Tech		–		6	–	5	–	0
Hawaii		–		6	–	5	–	0
Miami (FL)		–		6	–	5	–	0
Southern Miss		–		6	–	5	–	0
Tampa		–		6	–	5	–	0
Holy Cross		–		5	–	5	–	1
Tulane		–		5	–	6	–	0
Colgate		–		4	–	6	–	0
Northern Illinois		–		4	–	7	–	0
Navy		–		4	–	7	–	0
South Carolina		–		4	–	7	–	0
Virginia Tech		–		4	–	7	–	0
West Virginia		–		4	–	7	–	0
Army		–		3	–	8	–	0
Dayton		–		3	–	8	–	0
Villanova		–		3	–	8	–	0
Air Force		–		2	–	9	–	0
Southern Illinois		–		2	–	9	–	0
Syracuse		–		2	–	9	–	0
Florida State		–		1	–	10	–	0
Marshall		–		1	–	10	–	0
Rankings from AP Poll

The 1974 Tulane Green Wave football team was an American football team that represented Tulane University during the 1974 NCAA Division I football season as an independent. In their fourth year under head coach Bennie Ellender, the team compiled a 5–6 record.

== Schedule ==
Date	Opponent	Rank	Site	Result	Attendance	Source
September 14	Southwestern Louisiana		Tulane Stadium; New Orleans, LA	W 17–16	29,878	
September 21	at Army		Michie Stadium; West Point, NY	W 31–14	30,279	
September 28	West Virginia		Tulane Stadium; New Orleans, LA	W 17–14	31,647	
October 12	at Air Force		Falcon Stadium; Colorado Springs, CO	W 10–3		
October 19	The Citadel	No. 20	Tulane Stadium; New Orleans, LA	W 30–3	41,499	
October 26	at Georgia Tech	No. 18	Grant Field; Atlanta, GA	L 7–27	48,623	
November 2	Kentucky		Tulane Stadium; New Orleans, LA	L 7–30	38,384	
November 9	at Boston College		Alumni Stadium; Chestnut Hill, MA	L 3–27	17,220	
November 16	at Vanderbilt		Dudley Field; Nashville, TN	L 22–30	15,000	
November 23	at LSU		Tiger Stadium; Baton Rouge, LA (Battle for the Rag)	L 22–24	66,017	
November 30 (Note: Tulane's scheduled season opener September 7 against Ole Miss was rescheduled to November 30 due to the approach of Hurricane Carmen.)	Ole Miss		Tulane Stadium; New Orleans, LA (rivalry)	L 10–26	21,628	
Rankings from AP Poll released prior to the game
