= 1974 West Texas State Buffaloes football team =

American college football season

1974 West Texas State Buffaloes football
- Conference: Missouri Valley Conference
- Record: 6–5 (3–3 MVC)
- Head coach: Gene Mayfield (4th season)
- Home stadium: Kimbrough Memorial Stadium

1974 Missouri Valley Conference football standings
	Conf.					Overall
Team	W		L		T	W		L		T
Tulsa $	6	–	0	–	0	8	–	3	–	0
Louisville	3	–	2	–	0	4	–	7	–	0
West Texas State	3	–	3	–	0	6	–	5	–	0
Drake	2	–	3	–	1	3	–	7	–	1
New Mexico State	2	–	3	–	0	5	–	6	–	0
North Texas State	1	–	3	–	2	2	–	7	–	2
Wichita State	1	–	4	–	1	1	–	9	–	1
$ – Conference champion

The 1974 West Texas State Buffaloes football team was an American football team that represented West Texas State University (now known as West Texas A&M University) as a member of the Missouri Valley Conference (MVC) during the 1974 NCAA Division I football season. In their fourth year under head coach Gene Mayfield, the Buffaloes compiled an overall record of 6–5 with a mark of 3–3 in conference play, finished third in the MVC, and outscored opponents by a total of 220 to 148.

On offense, the Buffaloes gained an average of 215.6 rushing yards and 88.5 passing yards per game. On defense, they allowed opponents an average of 155.5 rushing yards and 129.7 passing yards per game. Quarterback Tuffy Blanchard led the team's passing attack with 858 passing yards and a 103.1 passer rating. Running back Johnny Darden led the team in both rushing (581 yards) and scoring (90 points on 15 touchdowns). Wide receiver Tracy Dickson led the team with 22 receptions for 589 yards, an average of 26.8 yards per reception.

The team played its home games at Kimbrough Memorial Stadium in Canyon, Texas.

== Schedule ==
Date	Opponent	Site	Result	Attendance	Source
September 14	at Drake	Drake Stadium; Des Moines, IA	W 37–17	13,400	
September 21	New Mexico State	Kimbrough Memorial Stadium; Canyon, TX	L 0–41	14,500	
September 28	Wichita State	Kimbrough Memorial Stadium; Canyon, TX	W 41–7	8,000	
October 5	Southern Miss*	Kimbrough Memorial Stadium; Canyon, TX	W 31–0	5,074	
October 12	at Idaho*	Idaho Stadium; Moscow, ID	W 21–6	15,200	
October 19	at Tulsa	Skelly Stadium; Tulsa, OK	L 14–17	22,000	
October 26	at Utah State*	Romney Stadium; Logan, UT	L 16–21	12,355	
November 2	Lamar*	Kimbrough Memorial Stadium; Canyon, TX	L 7–9		
November 9	at Tampa*	Tampa Stadium; Tampa, FL	W 24–6	15,517	
November 16	North Texas State	Kimbrough Memorial Stadium; Canyon, TX	W 21–14	12,865	
November 30	at Louisville	Fairgrounds Stadium; Louisville, KY	L 8–10	2,498	
*Non-conference game
