= 1974 Memphis State Tigers football team =

American college football season

1974 Memphis State Tigers football
- Conference: Independent
- Record: 7–4
- Head coach: Fred Pancoast (3rd season)
- Captain: James Thompson
- Home stadium: Memphis Memorial Stadium

1974 NCAA Division I independents football records
	Conf.			Overall
Team	W	L	T	W		L		T
No. 6 Notre Dame		–		10	–	2	–	0
No. 7 Penn State		–		10	–	2	–	0
Temple		–		8	–	2	–	0
Boston College		–		8	–	3	–	0
Utah State		–		8	–	3	–	0
No. 19 Houston		–		8	–	3	–	1
Rutgers		–		7	–	3	–	1
Cincinnati		–		7	–	4	–	0
Memphis State		–		7	–	4	–	0
Pittsburgh		–		7	–	4	–	0
Georgia Tech		–		6	–	5	–	0
Hawaii		–		6	–	5	–	0
Miami (FL)		–		6	–	5	–	0
Southern Miss		–		6	–	5	–	0
Tampa		–		6	–	5	–	0
Holy Cross		–		5	–	5	–	1
Tulane		–		5	–	6	–	0
Colgate		–		4	–	6	–	0
Northern Illinois		–		4	–	7	–	0
Navy		–		4	–	7	–	0
South Carolina		–		4	–	7	–	0
Virginia Tech		–		4	–	7	–	0
West Virginia		–		4	–	7	–	0
Army		–		3	–	8	–	0
Dayton		–		3	–	8	–	0
Villanova		–		3	–	8	–	0
Air Force		–		2	–	9	–	0
Southern Illinois		–		2	–	9	–	0
Syracuse		–		2	–	9	–	0
Florida State		–		1	–	10	–	0
Marshall		–		1	–	10	–	0
Rankings from AP Poll

The 1974 Memphis State Tigers football team represented Memphis State University (now known as the University of Memphis) as an independent during the 1974 NCAA Division I football season. In its third and final season under head coach Fred Pancoast, the team compiled an 7–4 record and outscored opponents by a total of 225 to 148. The team played its home games at Memphis Memorial Stadium in Memphis, Tennessee.

The team's statistical leaders included David Fowler with 1,266 passing yards, Reuben Gibson with 493 rushing yards, James Thompson with 395 receiving yards, and James Thompson and Terdell Middleton with 30 points scored each.

== Schedule ==
Date	Opponent	Site	Result	Attendance	Source
September 7	at Louisville	Fairgrounds Stadium; Louisville, KY (rivalry)	W 16–10	20,634	
September 14	Southern Miss	Memphis Memorial Stadium; Memphis, TN (Black and Blue Bowl)	L 0–6	26,608	
September 21	Ole Miss	Memphis Memorial Stadium; Memphis, TN (rivalry)	W 15–7	50,164	
September 28	at Colorado State	Hughes Stadium; Fort Collins, CO	W 20–18	23,984	
October 12	Cincinnati	Memphis Memorial Stadium; Memphis, TN (rivalry)	W 13–7	20,142	
October 19	at Mississippi State	Scott Field; Starkville, MS	L 28–29	35,000	
October 26	at North Texas State	Fouts Field; Denton, TX	W 41–0	5,700	
November 2	Florida State^{†}	Memphis Memorial Stadium; Memphis, TN	W 42–14	20,689	
November 9	at Tennessee	Neyland Stadium; Knoxville, TN	L 6–34	68,738	
November 16	at No. 14 Houston	Houston Astrodome; Houston, TX	L 10–13	23,893	
November 23	Wichita State	Memphis Memorial Stadium; Memphis, TN	W 34–10	18,456	
^{†}Homecoming; Rankings from AP Poll released prior to the game
