= Joe Jackson (linebacker, born 1953) =

American gridiron football player (born 1953)

No. 75
- Position: Linebacker

Personal information
- Born: July 27, 1953 (age 73); Chicopee, Massachusetts, U.S.
- Listed height: 6 ft 3 in (1.91 m)
- Listed weight: 225 lb (102 kg)

Career information
- College: Penn State
- NFL draft: 1975: 10th round, 256th overall pick

Career history
- 1975: Miami Dolphins*
- 1975–1976: Winnipeg Blue Bombers
- 1977: Philadelphia Eagles*
- * Offseason or practice squad member only

Joe Jackson (born July 27, 1953) is an American former professional football linebacker who played two seasons with the Winnipeg Blue Bombers of the Canadian Football League (CFL). He was selected by the Miami Dolphins in the tenth round of the 1975 NFL draft after playing college football at Pennsylvania State University.

== Early life ==
Joe Jackson was born on July 27, 1953, in Chicopee, Massachusetts. He played for the Penn State Nittany Lions. He was on the freshman team in 1971 and was a two-year leterman from 1973 to 1974. He returned an onside kick for a touchdown in the 1975 Cotton Bowl.

== Professional career ==
Jackson was selected by the Miami Dolphins in the tenth round, with the 256th overall pick, of the 1975 NFL draft as a tight end or wide receiver. He was released by the Dolphins in August 1975.

He played in twelve games for the Winnipeg Blue Bombers from 1975 to 1976.

Jackson signed with the Philadelphia Eagles in 1977. On August 9, 1977, he was placed on injured reserve.
