= 1974 Cincinnati Bearcats football team =

American college football season

1974 Cincinnati Bearcats football
- Conference: Independent
- Record: 7–4
- Head coach: Tony Mason (2nd season)
- Captains: Tom Rose; Tom Marvaso
- Home stadium: Nippert Stadium

1974 NCAA Division I independents football records
| | Conf. | | | Overall |
| Team | W | L | T | W | | L | | T |
|---|---|---|---|---|---|---|---|---|
| No. 6 Notre Dame | | – | | 10 | – | 2 | – | 0 |
| No. 7 Penn State | | – | | 10 | – | 2 | – | 0 |
| Temple | | – | | 8 | – | 2 | – | 0 |
| Boston College | | – | | 8 | – | 3 | – | 0 |
| Utah State | | – | | 8 | – | 3 | – | 0 |
| No. 19 Houston | | – | | 8 | – | 3 | – | 1 |
| Rutgers | | – | | 7 | – | 3 | – | 1 |
| Cincinnati | | – | | 7 | – | 4 | – | 0 |
| Memphis State | | – | | 7 | – | 4 | – | 0 |
| Pittsburgh | | – | | 7 | – | 4 | – | 0 |
| Georgia Tech | | – | | 6 | – | 5 | – | 0 |
| Hawaii | | – | | 6 | – | 5 | – | 0 |
| Miami (FL) | | – | | 6 | – | 5 | – | 0 |
| Southern Miss | | – | | 6 | – | 5 | – | 0 |
| Tampa | | – | | 6 | – | 5 | – | 0 |
| Holy Cross | | – | | 5 | – | 5 | – | 1 |
| Tulane | | – | | 5 | – | 6 | – | 0 |
| Colgate | | – | | 4 | – | 6 | – | 0 |
| Northern Illinois | | – | | 4 | – | 7 | – | 0 |
| Navy | | – | | 4 | – | 7 | – | 0 |
| South Carolina | | – | | 4 | – | 7 | – | 0 |
| Virginia Tech | | – | | 4 | – | 7 | – | 0 |
| West Virginia | | – | | 4 | – | 7 | – | 0 |
| Army | | – | | 3 | – | 8 | – | 0 |
| Dayton | | – | | 3 | – | 8 | – | 0 |
| Villanova | | – | | 3 | – | 8 | – | 0 |
| Air Force | | – | | 2 | – | 9 | – | 0 |
| Southern Illinois | | – | | 2 | – | 9 | – | 0 |
| Syracuse | | – | | 2 | – | 9 | – | 0 |
| Florida State | | – | | 1 | – | 10 | – | 0 |
| Marshall | | – | | 1 | – | 10 | – | 0 |
Rankings from AP Poll

The 1974 Cincinnati Bearcats football team represented University of Cincinnati as an independent during 1974 NCAA Division I football season. Led by secpnd-year head coach Tony Mason, the Bearcats compiled a record of 7–4. The team played home games at Nippert Stadium in Cincinnati.

== Schedule ==
| Date | Opponent | Site | Result | Attendance | Source |
|---|---|---|---|---|---|
| September 14 | at Washington | Husky Stadium; Seattle, WA | L 17–21 | 47,000 | |
| September 21 | at Rice | Rice Stadium; Houston, TX | W 28–21 | 15,000 | |
| September 28 | Louisville | Nippert Stadium; Cincinnati, OH (The Keg of Nails) | W 7–6 | 14,484 | |
| October 12 | at Memphis State | Memphis Memorial Stadium; Memphis, TN (rivalry) | L 7–13 | 20,142 | |
| October 19 | at Wichita State | Cessna Stadium; Wichita, KS | W 43–0 | 10,732 | |
| October 25 | at Houston | Houston Astrodome; Houston, TX | L 6–27 | 19,193 | |
| November 2 | No. 19 Temple | Nippert Stadium; Cincinnati, OH | W 22–20 | 18,303 | |
| November 9 | Ohio | Nippert Stadium; Cincinnati, OH | W 35–13 | 12,324 | |
| November 16 | No. 12 Miami (OH) | Nippert Stadium; Cincinnati, OH (Victory Bell) | L 7–27 | 23,342 | |
| November 23 | Chattanooga | Nippert Stadium; Cincinnati, OH | W 35–20 | 5,793 | |
| November 30 | Northeast Louisiana | Nippert Stadium; Cincinnati, OH | W 20–7 | 9,332 | |
Rankings from AP Poll released prior to the game

== Roster ==
1974 Cincinnati Bearcats football team roster
| Players | | | Coaches |
|---|---|---|---|
| Offense: Pos. / # / Name / Class; TE, P / 82 / Jeff West / Sr | Defense: Pos. / # / Name / Class | Special teams: Pos. / # / Name / Class | Head coach: Tony Mason; Coordinators/assistant coaches Legend: (C) Team captain; (S) Suspended; (I) Ineligible; Injured; Redshirt |
