= 1974 Wichita State Shockers football team =

American college football season

1974 Wichita State Shockers football
- Conference: Missouri Valley Conference
- Record: 1–9–1 (1–4–1 MVC)
- Head coach: Jim Wright (1st season)
- Home stadium: Cessna Stadium

1974 Missouri Valley Conference football standings
	Conf.					Overall
Team	W		L		T	W		L		T
Tulsa $	6	–	0	–	0	8	–	3	–	0
Louisville	3	–	2	–	0	4	–	7	–	0
West Texas State	3	–	3	–	0	6	–	5	–	0
Drake	2	–	3	–	1	3	–	7	–	1
New Mexico State	2	–	3	–	0	5	–	6	–	0
North Texas State	1	–	3	–	2	2	–	7	–	2
Wichita State	1	–	4	–	1	1	–	9	–	1
$ – Conference champion

The 1974 Wichita State Shockers football team was an American football team that represented Wichita State University as a member of the Missouri Valley Conference (MVC) during the 1974 NCAA Division I football season. In their first year under head coach Jim Wright, the team compiled an overall record of 1–9–1 with a mark of 1–4–1 in conference play, finishing in seventh place in the MVC. Prior to hiring Wright, Wichita State offered the head coaching job to John Merritt of Tennessee State, who would have become the first black head coach of a major college football. Merritt, however, chose to remain at Tennessee State out of loyalty to his players and assistants.

== Schedule ==
Date	Opponent	Site	Result	Attendance	Source
September 7	New Mexico State	Cessna Stadium; Wichita, KS	L 12–13	25,412	
September 14	at Oklahoma State*	Lewis Field; Stillwater, OK	L 0–59	34,000	
September 21	at Kansas State*	KSU Stadium; Manhattan, KS	L 0–17	32,800	
September 28	at West Texas State	Kimbrough Memorial Stadium; Canyon, TX	L 7–41	8,000	
October 5	Louisville	Cessna Stadium; Wichita, KS	L 7–14	15,903	
October 12	at Tulsa	Skelly Stadium; Tulsa, OK	L 13–35	20,000	
October 19	Cincinnati*	Cessna Stadium; Wichita, KS	L 0–43	10,732	
November 2	Drake	Cessna Stadium; Wichita, KS	W 23–14	6,238	
November 9	North Texas State	Cessna Stadium; Wichita, KS	T 10–10	8,724	
November 15	at Fresno State*	Ratcliffe Stadium; Fresno, CA	L 12–24	5,878	
November 23	at Memphis State*	Liberty Bowl Memorial Stadium; Memphis, TN	L 10–34	18,456	
*Non-conference game
