= 1974 Tulsa Golden Hurricane football team =

American college football season

1974 Tulsa Golden Hurricane football

MVC champion
- Conference: Missouri Valley Conference

Ranking
- Coaches: No. 19
- Record: 8–3 (6–0 MVC)
- Head coach: F. A. Dry (3rd season)
- Home stadium: Skelly Stadium

1974 Missouri Valley Conference football standings
	Conf.					Overall
Team	W		L		T	W		L		T
Tulsa $	6	–	0	–	0	8	–	3	–	0
Louisville	3	–	2	–	0	4	–	7	–	0
West Texas State	3	–	3	–	0	6	–	5	–	0
Drake	2	–	3	–	1	3	–	7	–	1
New Mexico State	2	–	3	–	0	5	–	6	–	0
North Texas State	1	–	3	–	2	2	–	7	–	2
Wichita State	1	–	4	–	1	1	–	9	–	1
$ – Conference champion

The 1974 Tulsa Golden Hurricane football team represented the University of Tulsa during the 1974 NCAA Division I football season. In their third year under head coach F. A. Dry, the Golden Hurricane compiled an 8–3 record, 6–0 against Missouri Valley Conference opponents, and won the conference championship.

The team's statistical leaders included Jeb Blount with 1,831 passing yards, Thomas Bailey with 456 rushing yards, and Steve Largent with 884 receiving yards. Largent went on to play 14 years in the National Football League and was inducted into the Pro Football Hall of Fame.

== Schedule ==
Date	Opponent	Site	Result	Attendance	Source
September 14	at Kansas State*	KSU Stadium; Manhattan, KS	L 14–31	18,000	
September 21	North Texas State	Skelly Stadium; Tulsa, OK	W 31–6	14,871–22,500	
September 28	at Arkansas*	Razorback Stadium; Fayetteville, AR	L 0–60	39,200	
October 5	at Tennessee*	Neyland Stadium; Knoxville, TN	L 10–17	67,256	
October 12	Wichita State	Skelly Stadium; Tulsa, OK	W 35–13	20,000	
October 19	West Texas State	Skelly Stadium; Tulsa, OK	W 17–14	22,000	
October 26	at Tampa*	Tampa Stadium; Tampa, FL	W 31–21	18,295	
November 2	at Louisville	Fairgrounds Stadium; Louisville, KY	W 37–7	9,146	
November 9	New Mexico State^{†}	Skelly Stadium; Tulsa, OK	W 28–7	10,000	
November 16	at Drake	Drake Stadium; Des Moines, IA	W 52–14	7,650	
November 30	No. 15 Houston*	Skelly Stadium; Tulsa, OK	W 30–14	15,500	
*Non-conference game; ^{†}Homecoming; Rankings from AP Poll released prior to the game

== Roster ==
1974 Tulsa Golden Hurricane football team roster
Players
Coaches
Offense

Pos.	#	Name	Class
OT	77	Steve August	Jr
QB	18	Jeb Blount	Jr
OT	70	Greg Fairchild	Jr
WR	88	Jessie Green	Jr
G	78	Wes Hamilton	Jr
WR	83	Steve Largent	Jr
RB	27	Rickey Watts	Fr

Defense

Pos.	#	Name	Class
CB	22	Bubby Tate	Jr

Special teams

Pos.	#	Name	Class
P	13	Rick Engles	Jr

Head coach

- F. A. Dry

Coordinators/assistant coaches

Legend

- (C) Team captain
- (S) Suspended
- (I) Ineligible
- Injured
- Redshirt

== After the season ==
=== 1975 NFL draft ===
The following Golden Hurricane players were selected in the 1975 NFL draft following the season.

Round	Pick	Player	Position	NFL club
8	208	Al Humphrey	Defensive end	Pittsburgh Steelers
13	334	Leonard Isabell	Wide receiver	Miami Dolphins
17	431	Mack Lancaster	Defensive tackle	Detroit Lions
