= 1974 Dayton Flyers football team =

American college football season

1974 Dayton Flyers football
- Conference: Independent
- Record: 3–8
- Head coach: Ron Marciniak (2nd season)
- Home stadium: Welcome Stadium

1974 NCAA Division I independents football records
	Conf.			Overall
Team	W	L	T	W		L		T
No. 6 Notre Dame		–		10	–	2	–	0
No. 7 Penn State		–		10	–	2	–	0
Temple		–		8	–	2	–	0
Boston College		–		8	–	3	–	0
Utah State		–		8	–	3	–	0
No. 19 Houston		–		8	–	3	–	1
Rutgers		–		7	–	3	–	1
Cincinnati		–		7	–	4	–	0
Memphis State		–		7	–	4	–	0
Pittsburgh		–		7	–	4	–	0
Georgia Tech		–		6	–	5	–	0
Hawaii		–		6	–	5	–	0
Miami (FL)		–		6	–	5	–	0
Southern Miss		–		6	–	5	–	0
Tampa		–		6	–	5	–	0
Holy Cross		–		5	–	5	–	1
Tulane		–		5	–	6	–	0
Colgate		–		4	–	6	–	0
Northern Illinois		–		4	–	7	–	0
Navy		–		4	–	7	–	0
South Carolina		–		4	–	7	–	0
Virginia Tech		–		4	–	7	–	0
West Virginia		–		4	–	7	–	0
Army		–		3	–	8	–	0
Dayton		–		3	–	8	–	0
Villanova		–		3	–	8	–	0
Air Force		–		2	–	9	–	0
Southern Illinois		–		2	–	9	–	0
Syracuse		–		2	–	9	–	0
Florida State		–		1	–	10	–	0
Marshall		–		1	–	10	–	0
Rankings from AP Poll

The 1974 Dayton Flyers football team represented the University of Dayton as an independent during the 1974 NCAA Division I football season. In their second season under head coach Ron Marciniak, the Flyers compiled a 3–8 record.

== Schedule ==
Date	Opponent	Site	Result	Attendance	Source
September 7	at Drake	Drake Stadium; Des Moines, IA	W 21–7	20,500	
September 14	Eastern Kentucky	Welcome Stadium; Dayton, OH	W 23–17		
September 21	at Bowling Green	Doyt Perry Stadium; Bowling Green, OH	L 21–41	11,653	
September 28	at Central Michigan	Perry Shorts Stadium; Mount Pleasant, MI	L 8–42	18,466	
October 5	Southern Illinois	Welcome Stadium; Dayton, OH	L 16–38	9,124	
October 12	at No. 3 Western Kentucky	L. T. Smith Stadium; Bowling Green, KY	L 15–32	20,000	
October 19	Toledo	Welcome Stadium; Dayton, OH	L 27–38	11,228	
October 26	at East Carolina	Ficklen Memorial Stadium; Greenville, NC	L 6–34	14,674	
November 2	Central State (OH)	Welcome Stadium; Dayton, OH	L 25–28	8,345	
November 9	Louisville	Welcome Stadium; Dayton, OH	L 15–20	6,250	
November 16	Marshall	Welcome Stadium; Dayton, OH	W 14–13	5,300	
Rankings from AP Poll released prior to the game
