= 1975 NFL draft =

National Football League draft

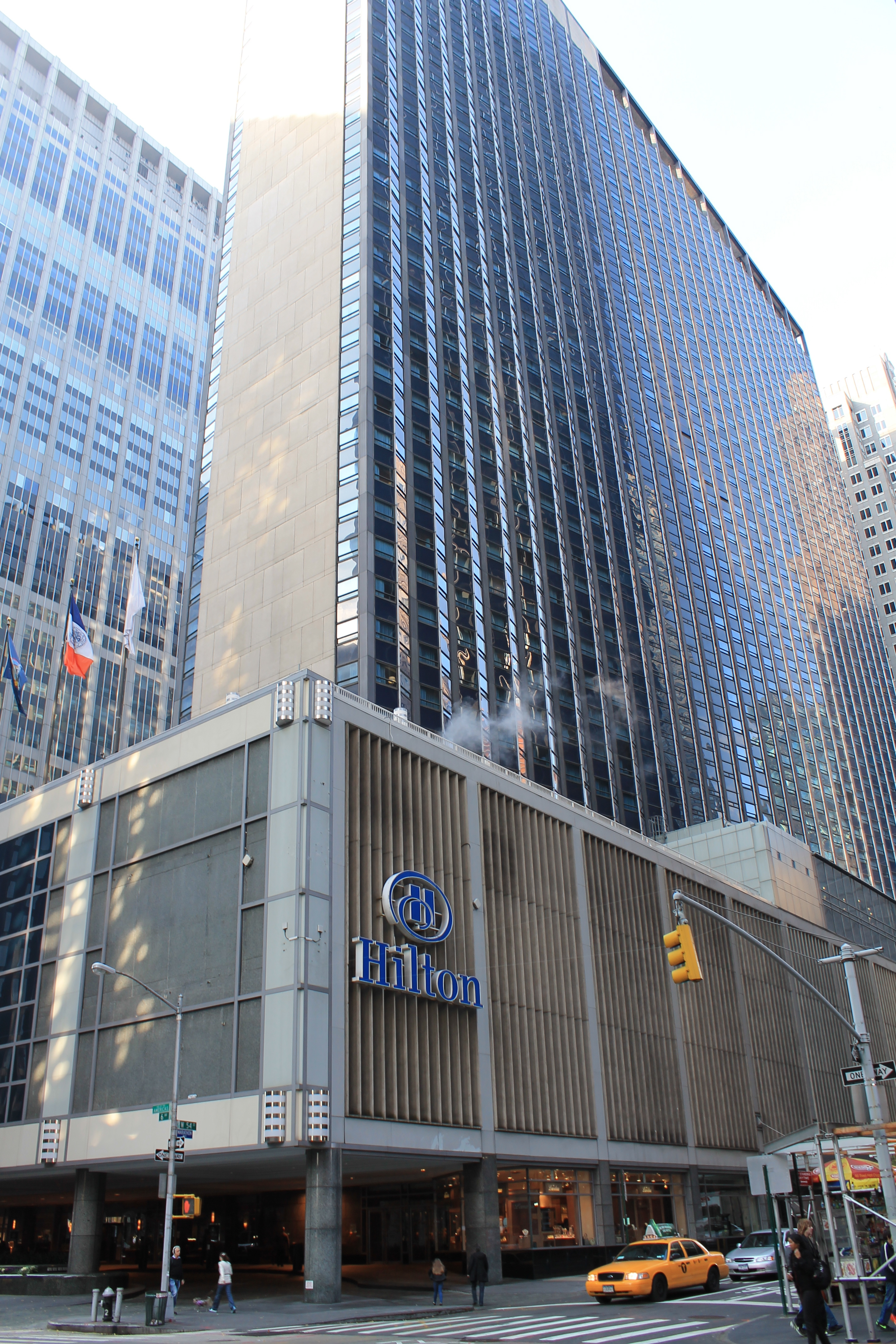
- 2012 photograph of the draft location

General information
- Date: January 28–29, 1975
- Location: Hilton at Rockefeller Center in New York City, New York

Overview
- 442 total selections in 17 rounds
- League: NFL
- First selection: Steve Bartkowski, QB; Atlanta Falcons
- Mr. Irrelevant: Stan Hegener, G Pittsburgh Steelers
- Most selections (26): Baltimore Colts
- Fewest selections (10): Oakland Raiders; Philadelphia Eagles; Washington Redskins
- Hall of Famers: 4: DT Randy White; RB Walter Payton; LB Robert Brazile; DE Fred Dean

The 1975 NFL draft was held January 28–29, 1975, at the New York Hilton at Rockefeller Center in New York City, New York. With the first overall pick of the draft, the Atlanta Falcons selected quarterback Steve Bartkowski.

== Player selections ==
*	= compensatory selection
†	= Pro Bowler
‡	= Hall of Famer

Positions key
Offense	Defense	Special teams
QB — Quarterback; RB — Running back; FB — Fullback; WR — Wide receiver; TE — Tight end; OL — Offensive lineman; T — Tackle; G — Guard; C — Center	DL — Defensive lineman; DT — Defensive tackle (Note: Includes nose tackle (NT)); DE — Defensive end; EDGE — Edge rusher; LB — Linebacker (Note: Includes middle linebacker (MLB/MIKE), weakside linebacker (WILL), strongside linebacker (SAM), off-ball linebacker, and outside linebacker (OLB)); DB — Defensive back; CB — Cornerback; S — Safety (Note: Includes free safety (FS) and strong safety (SS))	K — Kicker (Note: Also known as a placekicker (PK)); P — Punter; LS — Long snapper; RS — Return specialist (Note: Includes kickoff and punt returners)

=== Round 1–9 ===
Rnd.	Pick	Team	Player	Pos.	College	Notes
1	1	Atlanta Falcons	Steve Bartkowski ^{†}	QB	California	from Baltimore
1	2	Dallas Cowboys	Randy White^{‡}^{†}	DT	Maryland	from N. Y. Giants
1	3	Baltimore Colts	Ken Huff	G	North Carolina	from Atlanta
1	4	Chicago Bears	Walter Payton^{‡}^{†}	RB	Jackson State	
1	5	Cleveland Browns	Mack Mitchell	DE	Houston	
1	6	Houston Oilers	Robert Brazile^{‡}^{†}	LB	Jackson State	from Kansas City
1	7	New Orleans Saints	Larry Burton	WR	Purdue	
1	8	San Diego Chargers	Gary Johnson ^{†}	DT	Grambling State	
1	9	Los Angeles Rams	Mike Fanning	DT	Notre Dame	from Green Bay
1	10	San Francisco 49ers	Jimmy Webb	DT	Mississippi State	
1	11	Los Angeles Rams	Dennis Harrah ^{†}	T	Miami (FL)	form Philadelphia
1	12	New Orleans Saints	Kurt Schumacher	T	Ohio State	from N. Y. Jets
1	13	Detroit Lions	Lynn Boden	G	South Dakota State	
1	14	Cincinnati Bengals	Glenn Cameron	LB	Florida	
1	15	Houston Oilers	Don Hardeman	RB	Texas A&I	
1	16	New England Patriots	Russ Francis ^{†}	TE	Oregon	
1	17	Denver Broncos	Louis Wright ^{†}	CB	San Jose State	
1	18	Dallas Cowboys	Tom Henderson	LB	Langston	
1	19	Buffalo Bills	Tom Ruud	LB	Nebraska	
1	20	Los Angeles Rams	Doug France ^{†}	T	Ohio State	
1	21	St. Louis Cardinals	Tim Gray	S	Texas A&M	
1	22	San Diego Chargers	Mike Williams	CB	LSU	from Washington
1	23	Miami Dolphins	Darryl Carlton	T	Tampa	
1	24	Oakland Raiders	Neal Colzie	CB	Ohio State	
1	25	Minnesota Vikings	Mark Mullaney	DE	Colorado State	
1	26	Pittsburgh Steelers	Dave Brown ^{†}	CB	Michigan	
2	27	New York Giants	Al Simpson	T	Colorado State	
2	28	Los Angeles Rams	Monte Jackson ^{†}	CB	San Diego State	from Baltimore via Green Bay
2	29	Atlanta Falcons	Ralph Ortega	LB	Florida	
2	30	San Diego Chargers	Louie Kelcher ^{†}	DT	SMU	from Cleveland
2	31	Chicago Bears	Mike Hartenstine	DE	Penn State	
2	32	New Orleans Saints	Lee Gross	C	Auburn	
2	33	San Diego Chargers	Fred Dean^{‡}^{†}	DE	Louisiana Tech	
2	34	Kansas City Chiefs	Elmore Stephens	TE	Kentucky	
2	35	San Francisco 49ers	Greg Collins	LB	Notre Dame	
2	36	Miami Dolphins	Fred Solomon	WR	Tampa	from Green Bay
2	37	New York Jets	Anthony Davis	RB	USC	
2	38	Detroit Lions	Doug English ^{†}	DT	Texas	
2	39	Cincinnati Bengals	Al Krevis	T	Boston College	
2	40	Houston Oilers	Emmett Edwards	WR	Kansas	
2	41	New England Patriots	Rod Shoate	LB	Oklahoma	
2	42	Buffalo Bills	Bob Nelson	LB	Nebraska	from Philadelphia
2	43	Denver Broncos	Charles Smith	DE	North Carolina Central	
2	44	Dallas Cowboys	Burton Lawless	G	Florida	
2	45	Oakland Raiders	Charlie Phillips	S	USC	from Buffalo
2	46	St. Louis Cardinals	Jim Germany	RB	New Mexico State	
2	47	Green Bay Packers	Bill Bain	G	USC	from Washington
2	48	Los Angeles Rams	Leroy Jones	DE	Norfolk State	
2	49	Miami Dolphins	Stan Winfrey	RB	Arkansas State	
2	50	Buffalo Bills	Glenn Loft	DB	Drake	from Oakland
2	51	Pittsburgh Steelers	Bob Barber	DE	Grambling State	
2	52	Minnesota Vikings	Art Riley	DT	USC	
3	53	Baltimore Colts	Mike Washington	CB	Alabama	
3	54	Denver Broncos	Mike Franckowiak	FB	Central Michigan	from N. Y. Giants
3	55	Cincinnati Bengals	Gary Burley	DE	Pittsburgh	from Atlanta
3	56	Baltimore Colts	Dave Pear ^{†}	DT	Washington	from Chicago
3	57	Cleveland Browns	Oscar Roan	TE	SMU	
3	58	Green Bay Packers	Willard Harrell	RB	Pacific	from San Diego
3	59	Kansas City Chiefs	Cornelius Walker	DT	Rice	
3	60	New Orleans Saints	Andrew Jones	RB	Washington State	
3	61	Los Angeles Rams	Geoff Reece	C	Washington State	from Green Bay
3	62	New York Giants	Danny Buggs	WR	West Virginia	from San Francisco
3	63	New Orleans Saints	Elois Grooms	DE	Tennessee Tech	from Detroit via Minnesota
3	64	Cincinnati Bengals	Gary Sheide	QB	BYU	
3	65	Atlanta Falcons	Woody Thompson	RB	Miami (FL)	from Houston
3	66	New England Patriots	Pete Cusick	DT	Ohio State	
3	67	Los Angeles Rams	Dan Nugent	TE	Auburn	from Philadelphia
3	68	New York Jets	Richard Wood	LB	USC	
3	69	Denver Broncos	Drew Mahalic	LB	Notre Dame	
3	70	Dallas Cowboys	Bob Breunig ^{†}	LB	Arizona State	
3	71	San Francisco 49ers	Jeff Hart	T	Oregon State	from Buffalo
3	72	San Francisco 49ers	Steve Mike-Mayer	K	Maryland	from Washington
3	73	San Diego Chargers	Mike Fuller	S	Auburn	from Los Angeles via Chicago
3	74	San Francisco 49ers	Wayne Baker	DT	BYU	from New Orleans
3	75	Miami Dolphins	Gerald Hill	LB	Houston	
3	76	Oakland Raiders	Louis Carter	RB	Maryland	
3	77	Cincinnati Bengals	Bo Harris	LB	LSU	from Minnesota
3	78	Pittsburgh Steelers	Walter White	TE	Maryland	
4	79	New York Giants	Robert Giblin	DB	Houston	
4	80	Baltimore Colts	Marshall Johnson	WR	Houston	
4	81	Atlanta Falcons	John Nessel	G	Penn State	
4	82	Cleveland Browns	Tony Peters ^{†}	CB	Oklahoma	
4	83	Chicago Bears	Virgil Livers	CB	Western Kentucky	
4	84	Denver Broncos	Steve Taylor	DB	Georgia	from Kansas City
4	85	San Francisco 49ers	Cleveland Elam ^{†}	DE	Tennessee State	from New Orleans
4	86	New England Patriots	Allen Carter	RB	USC	from San Diego via Cleveland
4	87	San Francisco 49ers	Frank Oliver	DB	Kentucky State	
4	88	Green Bay Packers	Steve Luke	S	Ohio State	
4	89	Minnesota Vikings	Harold Henson	RB	Ohio State	from Cincinnati
4	90	Dallas Cowboys	Pat Donovan ^{†}	DE	Stanford	from Houston
4	91	New England Patriots	Steve Burks	WR	Arkansas State	
4	92	New Orleans Saints	John Starkebaum	DB	Nebraska	from Philadelphia
4	93	Baltimore Colts	Paul Linford	DT	BYU	from N. Y. Jets
4	94	Detroit Lions	Craig Hertwig	T	Georgia	
4	95	Denver Broncos	Rick Upchurch ^{†}	WR	Minnesota	
4	96	Dallas Cowboys	Randy Hughes	S	Oklahoma	
4	97	Cincinnati Bengals	Stan Fritts	RB	NC State	from Buffalo
4	98	Los Angeles Rams	Rod Perry ^{†}	CB	Colorado	
4	99	New Orleans Saints	Charlie Hall	DE	Tulane	from St. Louis
4	100	Miami Dolphins	Bruce Elia	LB	Ohio State	
4	101	San Diego Chargers	Kenneth Bernich	LB	Auburn	from Oakland
4	102	Buffalo Bills	Tom Donchez	RB	Penn State	from Washington
4	103	Minnesota Vikings	Bruce Adams	WR	Kansas	
4	104	Pittsburgh Steelers	Harold Evans	LB	Houston	
5	105	Baltimore Colts	Roosevelt Leaks	RB	Texas	
5	106	Miami Dolphins	Morris Owens	WR	Arizona State	from N. Y. Giants
5	107	Denver Broncos	Stan Rogers	T	Maryland	from Atlanta
5	108	Washington Redskins	Mike Thomas ^{†}	RB	UNLV	from Chicago
5	109	Cleveland Browns	John Zimba	DE	Villanova	
5	110	Chicago Bears	Revie Sorey	G	Illinois	from New Orleans
5	111	San Diego Chargers	Kevin Nosbusch	DT	Notre Dame	
5	112	Los Angeles Rams	Wayne Hammond	DT	Montana State	from Kansas City
5	113	Dallas Cowboys	Kyle Davis	C	Oklahoma	from Green Bay
5	114	San Francisco 49ers	Wayne Bullock	RB	Notre Dame	
5	115	Buffalo Bills	John McCrumbly	LB	Texas A&M	from Houston via Oakland
5	116	New England Patriots	Steve Grogan	QB	Kansas State	
5	117	New England Patriots	Steve Freeman	S	Mississippi State	from Philadelphia
5	118	New York Jets	Joe Wysock	G	Miami (FL)	
5	119	Cleveland Browns	Jim Cope	LB	Ohio State	from Detroit
5	120	Cincinnati Bengals	Pat McInally ^{†}	WR	Harvard	
5	121	Denver Broncos	Rubin Carter	DT	Miami (FL)	
5	122	Cincinnati Bengals	Jeff West	P	Cincinnati	from Dallas
5	123	Atlanta Falcons	Greg McCrary	TE	Clark Atlanta	from Buffalo
5	124	St. Louis Cardinals	Harvey Goodman	T	Colorado	
5	125	San Diego Chargers	Charles Waddell	TE	North Carolina	from Washington via Los Angeles through Buffalo
5	126	Los Angeles Rams	Rick Nuzum	C	Kentucky	
5	127	Miami Dolphins	Barry Hill	S	Iowa State	
5	128	Oakland Raiders	David Humm	QB	Nebraska	
5	129	Minnesota Vikings	Robert Miller	RB	Kansas	
5	130	Pittsburgh Steelers	Brent Sexton	CB	Elon	
6	131	Baltimore Colts	Don Westbrook	WR	Nebraska	from N. Y. Giants
6	132	Atlanta Falcons	Fulton Kuykendall	LB	UCLA	from Baltimore
6	133	Atlanta Falcons	Doug Payton	G	Colorado	
6	134	San Diego Chargers	John Carroll	WR	Oklahoma	from Cleveland
6	135	Chicago Bears	Bob Avellini	QB	Maryland	
6	136	San Diego Chargers	Billy Shields	T	Georgia Tech	
6	137	Kansas City Chiefs	Morris LaGrand	RB	Tampa	
6	138	Detroit Lions	Fred Cooper	DB	Purdue	from New Orleans
6	139	Kansas City Chiefs	Dave Wasick	LB	San Jose State	from San Francisco
6	140	Los Angeles Rams	Darius McCarthy	WR	South Carolina State	
6	141	Detroit Lions	Horace King	RB	Georgia	from New England
6	142	Cincinnati Bengals	Tom Shuman	QB	Penn State	from Philadelphia
6	143	Miami Dolphins	Steve Towle	LB	Kansas	from N. Y. Jets
6	144	Detroit Lions	Dennis Franklin	WR	Michigan	
6	145	Cincinnati Bengals	Rollen Smith	DB	Arkansas	
6	146	Houston Oilers	Jesse O'Neal	DE	Grambling State	
6	147	Washington Redskins	Mark Doak	T	Nebraska	from Denver
6	148	Dallas Cowboys	Roland Woolsey	CB	Boise State	
6	149	New Orleans Saints	Mike Lemon	LB	Kansas	from Buffalo
6	150	Cleveland Browns	Charles Miller	DB	West Virginia	from Washington
6	151	Chicago Bears	Tom Hicks	LB	Illinois	from Los Angeles via San Diego
6	152	St. Louis Cardinals	Larry Jameson	DT	Indiana	
6	153	New York Jets	Tom Alward	G	Nebraska	from Miami
6	154	Cleveland Browns	Henry Hynoski	RB	Temple	from Oakland
6	155	Minnesota Vikings	Bubba Broussard	LB	Houston	
6	156	Pittsburgh Steelers	Marvin Crenshaw	T	Nebraska	
7	157	Baltimore Colts	Kim Jones	RB	Colorado State	
7	158	New York Giants	Jim Obradovich	TE	USC	
7	159	Atlanta Falcons	Mike Esposito	RB	Boston College	
7	160	Baltimore Colts	Steve Joachim	QB	Temple	from Chicago
7	161	Cleveland Browns	Merle Wang	T	TCU	
7	162	Houston Oilers	Mike Biehle	T	Miami (OH)	from Kansas City
7	163	New Orleans Saints	Steve Rogers	RB	LSU	
7	164	San Diego Chargers	Rickey Young	RB	Jackson State	
7	165	Green Bay Packers	Tony Giaquinto	WR	Central Connecticut State	
7	166	Buffalo Bills	Gil Chapman	RB	Michigan	from San Francisco
7	167	Philadelphia Eagles	Bill Capraun	T	Miami (FL)	
7	168	Baltimore Colts	Derrel Luce	LB	Baylor	from N. Y. Jets via Chicago
7	169	Detroit Lions	Mike Murphy	WR	Drake	
7	170	Cincinnati Bengals	Chris Devlin	LB	Penn State	
7	171	Houston Oilers	Mark Cotney	S	Cameron	
7	172	New England Patriots	Lawrence Williams	WR	Texas Tech	
7	173	Dallas Cowboys	Michael Hegman	LB	Tennessee State	
7	174	Buffalo Bills	Reggie Cherry	RB	Houston	from Denver
7	175	Buffalo Bills	Harry Banks	DB	Michigan	
7	176	Los Angeles Rams	Pat Haden ^{†}	QB	USC	
7	177	St. Louis Cardinals	Steve Beaird	RB	Baylor	
7	178	Chicago Bears	Earl Douthitt	S	Iowa	from Washington via St. Louis
7	179	Miami Dolphins	Phillip Kent	RB	Baylor	
7	180	Oakland Raiders	James Daniels	DB	Texas A&M	
7	181	Minnesota Vikings	Henry Green	RB	Southern	
7	182	Pittsburgh Steelers	Wayne Mattingly	T	Colorado	
8	183	New York Giants	John Tate	LB	Jackson State	
8	184	Baltimore Colts	John Bushong	DE	Western Kentucky	
8	185	Atlanta Falcons	Brent Adams	T	Chattanooga	
8	186	Cleveland Browns	Barry Santini	TE	Purdue	
8	187	Baltimore Colts	Greg Denboer	TE	Michigan	from Chicago via Denver
8	188	St. Louis Cardinals	John Adams	DT	West Virginia	from New Orleans
8	189	Kansas City Chiefs	Wayne Hoffman	T	Oklahoma	from San Diego via Washington
8	190	Pittsburgh Steelers	Tom Knopp	LB	Kearney State	from Kansas City
8	191	San Francisco 49ers	Preston Kendrick	LB	Florida	
8	192	Baltimore Colts	Mario Cage	RB	Northwestern State	from Green Bay
8	193	New York Jets	James Scott	WR	Henderson County J. C.	
8	194	Detroit Lions	Leonard Thompson	RB	Oklahoma State	
8	195	Cincinnati Bengals	Ricky Davis	SS	Alabama	
8	196	Houston Oilers	Jerry Lawrence	DT	South Dakota State	
8	197	Chicago Bears	Joe Harris	LB	Georgia Tech	from New England
8	198	Philadelphia Eagles	Jeff Bleamer	T	Penn State	
8	199	Denver Broncos	Steve Foley	CB	Tulane	
8	200	Dallas Cowboys	Mitch Hoopes	P	Arizona	
8	201	Buffalo Bills	John Hill	DT	Duke	
8	202	St. Louis Cardinals	Louis Lauriano	DB	Long Beach State	
8	203	San Diego Chargers	Barry Collier	T	Georgia	from Washington
8	204	Los Angeles Rams	John Washington	DB	Tulane	
8	205	Miami Dolphins	Barney Crawford	DT	Harding	
8	206	San Diego Chargers	Ralph Perretta	G	Purdue	from Oakland
8	207	Minnesota Vikings	Joe Hollimon	DB	Arkansas State	
8	208	Pittsburgh Steelers	Al Humphrey	DE	Tulsa	
9	209	Baltimore Colts	Royce McKinney	S	Kentucky State	
9	210	New York Giants	Mike Mohoney	WR	Richmond	
9	211	Atlanta Falcons	Brad Davis	RB	LSU	
9	212	Chicago Bears	Roger Stillwell	DT	Stanford	
9	213	Cleveland Browns	Larry Poole	RB	Kent State	
9	214	San Diego Chargers	Larry Keller	LB	Houston	
9	215	Cleveland Browns	Floyd Hogan	DB	Arkansas	from Kansas City
9	216	New Orleans Saints	Mike Strachan	RB	Iowa State	
9	217	Green Bay Packers	Jay Hodgin	RB	South Carolina	
9	218	San Francisco 49ers	James Johnson	DB	Tennessee State	
9	219	Detroit Lions	Steve Strinko	LB	Michigan	
9	220	Cincinnati Bengals	Greg Dubinetz	G	Yale	
9	221	Houston Oilers	Bob Bruer	TE	Mankato State	
9	222	Pittsburgh Steelers	Eugene Clark	G	UCLA	from New England
9	223	San Francisco 49ers	Dan Natale	TE	Penn State	from Philadelphia
9	224	New York Jets	Everett Taylor	CB	Memphis State	
9	225	Denver Broncos	Rousell Williams	DB	Arizona	
9	226	Dallas Cowboys	Ed Jones	S	Rutgers	
9	227	Cincinnati Bengals	Lofell Williams	WR	Virginia Union	from Buffalo
9	228	Washington Redskins	Dallas Hickman	DE	California	
9	229	Los Angeles Rams	Gordon Riegel	LB	Stanford	
9	230	San Francisco 49ers	Caesar Douglas	T	Illinois Wesleyan	from St. Louis
9	231	Miami Dolphins	James Wilson	G	Clark	
9	232	Oakland Raiders	Harry Knight	QB	Richmond	
9	233	Minnesota Vikings	John Passananti	G	Western Illinois	
9	234	Pittsburgh Steelers	Bruce Reimer	RB	North Dakota State	

=== Round 10 ===
Pick #	NFL team	Player	Position	College
235	New York Giants	Terry McClowry	Linebacker	Michigan State
236	Baltimore Colts	Phil Waganheim	Punter	Maryland
237	Atlanta Falcons	Marshall Mills	Wide receiver	West Virginia
238	Cleveland Browns	Stan Lewis	Defensive end	Wayne State (NE)
239	Miami Dolphins	Clyde Russell	Running back	Oklahoma
240	Denver Broncos	Hank Englehardt	Center	Pacific
241	New Orleans Saints	Chuck Heater	Running back	Michigan
242	San Diego Chargers	Otha Bradley	Defensive tackle	USC
243	San Francisco 49ers	Donnie Layton	Running back	South Carolina State
244	Green Bay Packers	Bill Cooke	Defensive end	Massachusetts
245	Cincinnati Bengals	Rockey Felker	Defensive back	Mississippi State
246	Houston Oilers	Alan Pringle	Kicker	Rice
247	Pittsburgh Steelers	Kirk Heyer	Defensive tackle	Kearney State
248	Philadelphia Eagles	Ken Schroy	Defensive back	Maryland
249	New York Jets	Charles James	Defensive back	Jackson State
250	Detroit Lions	Brad Boyd	Tight end	Louisiana State
251	Denver Broncos	Steve Haggerty	Wide receiver	UNLV
252	Dallas Cowboys	Dennis Booker	Running back	Millersville (PA)
253	Buffalo Bills	Roland Hooks	Running back	North Carolina State
254	Chicago Bears	Mike Julius	Guard	St. Thomas (MN)
255	St. Louis Cardinals	Mike McGraw	Linebacker	Wyoming
256	Miami Dolphins	Joe Jackson	Tight end	Penn State
257	Miami Dolphins	Joe Danelo	Kicker	Washington State
258	Minnesota Vikings	Neil Clabo	Punter	Tennessee
259	Oakland Raiders	Steve Sylvester	Tackle	Notre Dame
260	Pittsburgh Steelers	Archie Gray	Wide receiver	Wyoming

=== Round 11 ===
Pick #	NFL team	Player	Position	College
261	Baltimore Colts	Dave Hazel	Wide receiver	Ohio State
262	New York Giants	George Martin	Defensive end	Oregon
263	Atlanta Falcons	Jeff Merrow	Defensive tackle	West Virginia
264	Chicago Bears	Mike Dean	Kicker	Texas
265	Cleveland Browns	Tom Marinelli	Guard	Boston College
266	New Orleans Saints	Danny Lee	Punter	N.E. Louisiana
267	San Diego Chargers	Vince Phason	Defensive back	Arizona
268	Kansas City Chiefs	Dale Hegland	Guard	Minnesota
269	Green Bay Packers	Bob Martin	Defensive end	Washington
270	San Francisco 49ers	Gene Hernandez	Defensive back	Texas Christian
271	Houston Oilers	John Sawyer	Tight end	Southern Mississippi
272	New England Patriots	Rene Garnett	Defensive back	Idaho State
273	Philadelphia Eagles	Keith Rowen	Guard	Stanford
274	New York Jets	Jon Bradford	Running back	Central State (OH)
275	Detroit Lions	Steve Myers	Guard	Ohio State
276	Cincinnati Bengals	Marvin Cobb	Defensive back	USC
277	Washington Redskins	Ardell Johnson	Defensive back	Nebraska
278	Dallas Cowboys	Greg Krpalek	Center	Oregon State
279	Buffalo Bills	Tom Drake	Defensive back	Michigan
280	St. Louis Cardinals	Jerry Latin	Running back	Northern Illinois
281	Los Angeles Rams	Howard Strickland	Running back	California
282	Washington Redskins	Jerry Hackenbruck	Defensive end	Oregon State
283	Miami Dolphins	John Dilworth	Defensive back	Northwest Louisiana
284	San Diego Chargers	Ike McBee	Wide receiver	San Jose State
285	Minnesota Vikings	Ike Spencer	Running back	Utah
286	Pittsburgh Steelers	Randy Little	Tight end	West Liberty

=== Round 12 ===
Pick #	NFL team	Player	Position	College
287	New York Giants	Marsh White	Running back	Arkansas
288	Baltimore Colts	Brad Storm	Linebacker	Iowa State
289	Atlanta Falcons	Alonza Picket	Tackle	Texas Southern
290	Cleveland Browns	Dick Ambrose	Linebacker	Virginia
291	Chicago Bears	Doug Plank	Defensive back	Ohio State
292	San Diego Chargers	Jerry Dahl	Linebacker	North Dakota State
293	Kansas City Chiefs	James Rackley	Running back	Florida A&M
294	New Orleans Saints	Ron Gustafson	Wide receiver	North Dakota
295	San Francisco 49ers	Rick Worley	Quarterback	Howard Payne
296	Green Bay Packers	Carlos Brown	Quarterback	Pacific
297	New England Patriots	Matt Kendon	Defensive tackle	Idaho State
298	Philadelphia Eagles	Richard Pawlewicz	Running back	William & Mary
299	New York Jets	Bert Cooper	Linebacker	Florida State
300	Detroit Lions	Andre Roundtree	Linebacker	Iowa State
301	Cincinnati Bengals	Jack Novak	Tight end	Wisconsin
302	Houston Oilers	Willie Miller	Wide receiver	Colorado State
303	Denver Broncos	Harry Walters	Linebacker	Maryland
304	Dallas Cowboys	Charles Bland	Defensive back	Cincinnati
305	Buffalo Bills	Mark Johnson	Defensive end	Missouri
306	New England Patriots	Condredge Holloway	Defensive back	Tennessee
307	Los Angeles Rams	Chandler Williams	Wide receiver	Lincoln
308	St. Louis Cardinals	Ben Jones	Wide receiver	Louisiana State
309	Miami Dolphins	Joe Yancey	Tackle	Henderson State
310	Oakland Raiders	Jack Magee	Center	Boston College
311	Minnesota Vikings	Autry Beamon	Defensive back	East Texas State
312	Pittsburgh Steelers	Greg Murphy	Defensive end	Penn State

=== Round 13 ===
Pick #	NFL team	Player	Position	College
313	Baltimore Colts	John Roman	Guard	Idaho State
314	New York Giants	Ricky Townsend	Kicker	Tennessee
315	Atlanta Falcons	Carl Russ	Linebacker	Michigan
316	Chicago Bears	Charles McDaniel	Running back	Louisiana Tech
317	Cleveland Browns	Willie Armstead	Wide receiver	Utah
318	Kansas City Chiefs	John Snider	Linebacker	Stanford
319	New Orleans Saints	Jim Upchurch	Running back	Arizona
320	San Diego Chargers	Peter Demmerle	Wide receiver	Notre Dame
321	Green Bay Packers	Bob Fuhriman	Defensive back	Utah State
322	San Francisco 49ers	Dale Mitchell	Linebacker	USC
323	Philadelphia Eagles	Tom Ehlers	Linebacker	Kentucky
324	New York Jets	Dan Spivey	Defensive tackle	Georgia
325	Detroit Lions	James Smith	Running back	North Carolina Central
326	Cincinnati Bengals	Ron Rosenberg	Linebacker	Montana
327	Houston Oilers	Ricky Scales	Wide receiver	Virginia Tech
328	New England Patriots	Joe Harvey	Defensive end	Northern Michigan
329	Denver Broncos	Eric Penick	Running back	Notre Dame
330	Dallas Cowboys	Herbert Scott	Guard	Virginia Union
331	Buffalo Bills	Mark Dienhart	Tackle	St. Thomas (MN)
332	Los Angeles Rams	A. J. Jacobs	Defensive back	Louisville
333	St. Louis Cardinals	Steve Lindgren	Defensive end	Hamline
334	Miami Dolphins	Leonard Isabell	Wide receiver	Tulsa
335	San Diego Chargers	Glen Printers	Running back	Southern Colorado State
336	Minnesota Vikings	Mike Hurd	Wide receiver	Michigan State
337	Pittsburgh Steelers	Bob Gaddis	Wide receiver	Mississippi Valley State
338	Washington Redskins	Morris McKie	Defensive back	North Carolina A&T

=== Round 14 ===
Pick #	NFL team	Player	Position	College
339	Miami Dolphins	James Lewis	Defensive back	Tennessee State
340	Baltimore Colts	Mike Smith	Center	Southern Methodist
341	Atlanta Falcons	Steve Robinson	Defensive tackle	Tuskegee
342	Cleveland Browns	Tim Barrett	Running back	John Carroll
343	Chicago Bears	Walter Hartfield	Running back	Southwest Texas State
344	New Orleans Saints	Randy Rhino	Defensive back	Georgia Tech
345	San Diego Chargers	Reggie Barnett	Defensive back	Notre Dame
346	Kansas City Chiefs	Gene Moshier	Guard	Vanderbilt
347	San Francisco 49ers	David Henson	Wide receiver	Abilene Christian
348	Green Bay Packers	Stan Blackmon	Tight end	North Texas State
349	New York Jets	Joe Fields	Center	Widener
350	Detroit Lions	Jim McMillan	Quarterback	Boise State
351	Cincinnati Bengals	Frank Haywood	Defensive tackle	North Carolina State
352	Houston Oilers	Jody Medford	Guard	Rice
353	New England Patriots	Tom Gossom	Wide receiver	Auburn
354	Philadelphia Eagles	Larry O'Rourke	Defensive tackle	Ohio State
355	Denver Broncos	Jerry Arnold	Guard	Oklahoma
356	Dallas Cowboys	Scott Laidlaw	Running back	Stanford
357	Buffalo Bills	Robert Evans	Wide receiver	Morris Brown
358	St. Louis Cardinals	Ritch Bahe	Wide receiver	Nebraska
359	Washington Redskins	Dave Benson	Linebacker	Weber State
360	Los Angeles Rams	Arthur Allen	Wide receiver	Clark
361	Miami Dolphins	John Graham	Quarterback	Colorado State
362	Oakland Raiders	Tom Doyle	Quarterback	Yale
363	Minnesota Vikings	Mike Strickland	Running back	Eastern Michigan
364	Pittsburgh Steelers	Mike Collier	Running back	Morgan State

=== Round 15 ===
Pick #	NFL team	Player	Position	College
365	Baltimore Colts	John Goodie	Running back	Langston
366	New York Giants	Jim O'Connor	Running back	Drake
367	Atlanta Falcons	Jimmy Robinson	Wide receiver	Georgia Tech
368	Chicago Bears	Steve Marcantonio	Wide receiver	Miami (FL)
369	Cleveland Browns	Willie Moore	Defensive tackle	Johnson C. Smith
370	San Diego Chargers	John Roush	Guard	Oklahoma
371	Pittsburgh Steelers	James Thatcher	Wide receiver	Langston
372	New Orleans Saints	Grant Burget	Running back	Oklahoma
373	Green Bay Packers	Randy Allen	Wide receiver	Southern
374	San Francisco 49ers	Rich Lavin	Tight end	Western Illinois
375	Detroit Lions	Rudy Green	Running back	Yale
376	Cincinnati Bengals	Greg Enright	Kicker	Southern Oregon State
377	Houston Oilers	Jack Holmes	Running back	Texas Southern
378	New England Patriots	Don Clayton	Running back	Murray State
379	Philadelphia Eagles	Clayton Korver	Defensive end	Northwestern (Iowa)
380	New York Jets	Brison Manor	Defensive tackle	Arkansas
381	Denver Broncos	Ken Shelton	Tight end	Virginia
382	Dallas Cowboys	Willie Hamilton	Running back	Arizona
383	Buffalo Bills	Chris Kupec	Quarterback	North Carolina
384	Washington Redskins	Art Kuehn	Center	UCLA
385	Los Angeles Rams	Alvin White	Quarterback	Oregon State
386	St. Louis Cardinals	Ron Franklin	Defensive tackle	Boise State
387	Miami Dolphins	Skip Johns	Running back	Carson-Newman
388	Minnesota Vikings	Ollie Bakken	Linebacker	Minnesota
389	Oakland Raiders	Paul Careathers	Running back	Tennessee
390	Pittsburgh Steelers	Marty Smith	Defensive tackle	Louisville

=== Round 16 ===
Pick #	NFL team	Player	Position	College
391	New York Giants	Jim Micklos	Tight end	Ball State
392	Baltimore Colts	Bill Malouf	Quarterback	Mississippi
393	Atlanta Falcons	Steve Knutson	Tackle	USC
394	Cleveland Browns	John McKay	Wide receiver	USC
395	Chicago Bears	Witt Beckman	Wide receiver	Miami (FL)
396	Kansas City Chiefs	Mark Peterson	Defensive end	Illinois
397	New Orleans Saints	Mike McDonald	Linebacker	Catawba
398	San Diego Chargers	Chip Salvestrini	Guard	Yankton
399	Baltimore Colts	Mike Evavold	Defensive tackle	MacAlester
400	Green Bay Packers	Bob McCaffrey	Center	USC
401	Cincinnati Bengals	John Tuttle	Wide receiver	Kansas State
402	Houston Oilers	Ken Lambert	Defensive back	Virginia Tech
403	New England Patriots	Kerry Marbury	Running back	West Virginia
404	Philadelphia Eagles	Calvin Jones	Wide receiver	Texas Tech
405	New York Jets	Greg Wells	Guard	Albany State
406	Detroit Lions	Les Chaves	Defensive back	Kansas State
407	Dallas Cowboys	Pete Clark	Tight end	Colorado State
408	Buffalo Bills	Tom Fine	Tight end	Notre Dame
409	Denver Broncos	Bubba Bridges	Defensive tackle	Colorado
410	Los Angeles Rams	Francis Reynolds	Running back	Alcorn A&M
411	St. Louis Cardinals	Mark Miller	Wide receiver	Missouri
412	Washington Redskins	Dennis Pavelka	Guard	Nebraska
413	Miami Dolphins	Vernon Smith	Center	Georgia
414	Minnesota Vikings	Tom Goedjen	Kicker	Iowa State
415	Pittsburgh Steelers	Miller Bassler	Tight end	Houston
416	Baltimore Colts	Robert Smith	Defensive back	Maryland

=== Round 17 ===
Pick #	NFL team	Player	Position	College
417	Baltimore Colts	David McKnight	Linebacker	Georgia
418	New York Giants	Rondy Colbert	Defensive back	Lamar
419	Atlanta Falcons	Mitch Anderson	Quarterback	Northwestern
420	Chicago Bears	Roland Harper	Running back	Louisiana Tech
421	Cleveland Browns	Dave Graf	Linebacker	Penn State
422	New Orleans Saints	Greg Westbrooks	Linebacker	Colorado
423	San Diego Chargers	Neal Jeffrey	Quarterback	Baylor
424	Kansas City Chiefs	Mike Bulino	Defensive back	Pittsburgh
425	Green Bay Packers	Tom Ray	Defensive back	Central Michigan
426	Baltimore Colts	Mike Bengard	Defensive end	Northwestern (Iowa)
427	Houston Oilers	Ricky Seeker	Center	Texas A&M
428	New England Patriots	Myke Horton	Tackle	UCLA
429	Philadelphia Eagles	Garry Webb	Defensive end	Temple
430	New York Jets	Mike Bartoszek	Tight end	Ohio State
431	Detroit Lions	Mark Lancaster	Guard	Tulsa
432	Cincinnati Bengals	Elvin Charity	Defensive back	Yale
433	Denver Broncos	Lester Sherman	Running back	Albany State
434	Dallas Cowboys	Jim Testerman	Tight end	Dayton
435	Buffalo Bills	Jeff Turcotte	Defensive end	Colorado
436	St. Louis Cardinals	Ken Monroe	Running back	Indiana State
437	Washington Redskins	Carl Taylor	Defensive end	Memphis State
438	Los Angeles Rams	Skip Boyd	Punter	Washington
439	Miami Dolphins	Dwaine Copeland	Running back	Middle Tennessee State
440	Baltimore Colts	Frank Russell	Wide receiver	Maryland
441	Minnesota Vikings	Adolph Bellizeare	Running back	Pennsylvania
442	Pittsburgh Steelers	Stan Hegener	Guard	Nebraska

== Notable undrafted players ==
^{†}	= Pro Bowler

Original NFL team	Player	Pos.	College	Notes
Buffalo Bills	Steven Schnarr	RB	Otterbein	
Cincinnati Bengals	Brad Cousino	LB	Miami	
Cleveland Browns	Robert Jackson	G	Duke	
Dallas Cowboys	Percy Howard	WR	Austin Peay	
Dallas Cowboys	Lee McGriff	WR	Florida	
Dallas Cowboys	Jim Zorn	QB	Cal Poly Pomona	
Denver Broncos	Reggie Pierson	CB	Oklahoma State	
Denver Broncos	Bob Swenson ^{†}	LB	California	
Green Bay Packers	Johnnie Gray	S	Cal State Fullerton	
Houston Oilers	Ted Thompson	LB	SMU	
Kansas City Chiefs	Charlie Ane	C	Michigan State	
Kansas City Chiefs	Mike Nott	QB	Santa Clara	
Kansas City Chiefs	J. T. Turner	G	Duke	
Los Angeles Rams	Rod Phillips	RB	Jackson State	
Miami Dolphins	Earnest Rhone	LB	Henderson State	
New England Patriots	David Tipton	DT	Western Illinois	
New Orleans Saints	Rusty Chambers	LB	Tulane	
New Orleans Saints	Sylvester Croom	C	Alabama	
New York Giants	Bobby Hammond	RB	Morgan State	
Oakland Raiders	Mike Reinfeldt ^{†}	S	Wisconsin-Milwaukee	
Philadelphia Eagles	Dennis Franks	C	Michigan	
Philadelphia Eagles	Jim Opperman	LB	Colorado State	
Pittsburgh Steelers	John Banaszak	DT	Eastern Michigan	
San Diego Chargers	Dwight McDonald	WR	San Diego State	
San Francisco 49ers	Bill Larson	TE	Colorado State	
Washington Redskins	Spencer Thomas	S	Washburn	

== Hall of Famers ==
- Walter Payton, running back from Jackson State, taken 1st round 4th overall by Chicago Bears

Inducted: Professional Football Hall of Fame class of 1993.

- Randy White, defensive tackle from Maryland, taken 1st round 2nd overall by Dallas Cowboys

Inducted: Professional Football Hall of Fame class of 1994.

- Fred Dean, defensive end from Louisiana Tech, taken 2nd round 33rd overall by San Diego Chargers

Inducted: Professional Football Hall of Fame class of 2008.

- Robert Brazile, linebacker from Jackson State, taken 1st round 6th overall by Houston Oilers

Inducted: Professional Football Hall of Fame Class of 2018.
