= 1975 Denver Broncos season =

American football team season

- Owner: Gerald Phipps
- General manager: John Ralston
- Head coach: John Ralston
- Home stadium: Mile High Stadium

Results
- Record: 6–8
- Division place: 2nd AFC West
- Playoffs: Did not qualify

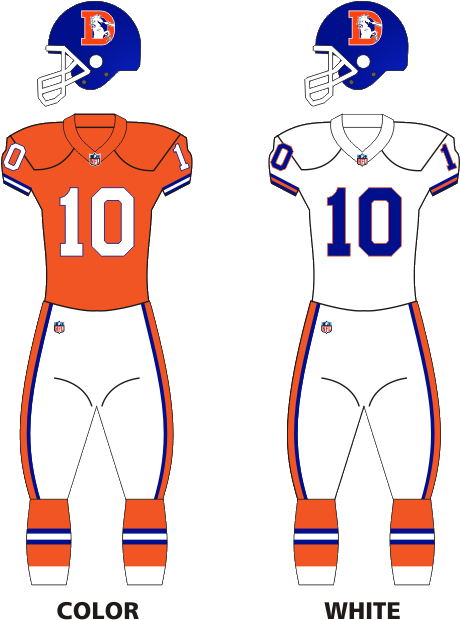
Uniforms worn by the NFL franchise Denver Broncos from 1968 to 1996.

The 1975 Denver Broncos season was the team's 16th year in professional football and its sixth with the National Football League (NFL). Led by fourth-year head coach and general manager John Ralston, the Broncos were 6–8, second in the AFC West, but five games behind the Oakland Raiders, who clinched in late November.

Denver opened the season with two wins at home, against the Chiefs and Packers, but won only four of their last twelve games. In their sixteen years of existence, the Broncos had yet to reach the postseason.

== Offseason ==
=== NFL draft ===
1975 Denver Broncos draft
Round	Pick	Player	Position	College	Notes
1	17	Louis Wright *	CB	San Jose State	
2	43	Charles Smith	DE	North Carolina Central	
3	54	Mike Franckowiak	FB	Central Michigan	
3	69	Drew Mahalic	LB	Notre Dame	
4	84	Steve Taylor	DB	Georgia	
4	95	Rick Upchurch *	WR	Minnesota	
5	107	Stan Rogers	T	Maryland	
5	121	Rubin Carter	DT	Miami (FL)	
8	199	Steve Foley	DB	Tulane	
9	225	Rousell Williams	DB	Arizona	
10	240	Hank Englehardt	C	Pacific	
10	251	Steve Haggerty	WR	UNLV	
12	303	Harry Walters	LB	Maryland	
13	329	Eric Penick	RB	Notre Dame	
14	355	Jerry Arnold	G	Oklahoma	
15	381	Ken Shelton	TE	Virginia	
16	409	Bubba Bridges	DT	Colorado	
17	433	Lester Sherman	RB	Albany State	
Made roster † Pro Football Hall of Fame * Made at least one Pro Bowl during career

== Personnel ==
=== Staff / Coaches ===
1975 Denver Broncos staff
Front office: Owner / Chairman of the Board – Gerald Phipps; Team President – Allan Phipps; Assistant General Manager/Director of Player Personnel – Fred Gehrke; Director of Scouting – Carroll Hardy; Head coaches: Vice President/General Manager/Head Coach – John Ralston; Offensive coaches: Offensive Coordinator/Offensive Backfield – Max Coley; Wide Receivers – Kay Dalton; Offensive Line – Jerry Frei	Defensive coaches: Defensive Coordinator – Joe Collier; Defensive Line – Doc Urich; Defensive Backs – Bob Gambold; Special teams coaches: Special Teams/Linebackers – Myrel Moore

=== Roster ===
1975 Denver Broncos roster
Quarterbacks (QB): 16 John Hufnagel; 12 Charley Johnson; 10 Steve Ramsey; Running backs (RB): 31 Mike Franckowiak; 23 Alfred Haywood; 32 Jon Keyworth; 44 Floyd Little; 22 Fran Lynch; 30 Oliver Ross; Wide receivers (WR): 82 Jack Dolbin; 25 Haven Moses; 80 Rick Upchurch; 42 Billy Van Heusen P; Tight ends (TE): 81 Bob Adams; 88 Riley Odoms	Offensive linemen (OL): 62 Brian Goodman G; 60 Paul Howard G; 50 Bobby Maples C; 71 Claudie Minor T; 78 Marv Montgomery T/G; 73 Stan Rogers T; 75 Tom Walker G; Defensive linemen (DL): 77 Lyle Alzado DT; 68 Rubin Carter DE/DT; 79 Barney Chavous DE; 63 John Grant DE; 58 Phil Olsen DE; 70 Paul Smith DT	Linebackers (LB): 52 Randy Gradishar MLB; 57 Tom Jackson OLB; 66 Jim O'Malley MLB; 59 Joe Rizzo OLB; 51 Bob Swenson OLB; Defensive backs (DB): 26 Calvin Jones CB; 21 Randy Poltl SS; 46 John Rowser FS/CB; 45 Jeff Severson FS; 48 Earlie Thomas CB; 36 Bill Thompson SS; 20 Louis Wright CB; Special teams (ST): 15 Jim Turner K	Reserve: 24 Otis Armstrong RB (IR); 87 Boyd Brown TE (IR); 74 Mike Current T (IR); —- Clarence Ellis FS (IR); 61 Tommy Lyons G (IR); 56 Ray May LB (IR); 67 Carl Schaukowitch G (IR); 64 Mike Schnitker G (IR); -- Ed Smith DE (IR); -- Charlie Smith DE (IR); Rookies in italics 41 active, 10 reserve, 0 practice squad

== Regular season ==
=== Schedule ===
Week	Date	Opponent	Result	Record	Venue	Attendance
1	September 21	**Kansas City Chiefs**	**W** 37–33	1–0	Mile High Stadium	51,858
2	September 29	Green Bay Packers	**W** 23–13	2–0	Mile High Stadium	52,621
3	October 5	at Buffalo Bills	**L** 14–38	2–1	Rich Stadium	79,864
4	October 12	at Pittsburgh Steelers	**L** 9–20	2–2	Three Rivers Stadium	49,169
5	October 19	Cleveland Browns	**W** 16–15	3–2	Mile High Stadium	52,590
6	October 26	at **Kansas City Chiefs**	**L** 13–26	3–3	Arrowhead Stadium	70,043
7	November 2	**Oakland Raiders**	**L** 17–42	3–4	Mile High Stadium	52,505
8	November 9	Cincinnati Bengals	**L** 16–17	3–5	Mile High Stadium	49,919
9	November 16	at **San Diego Chargers**	**W** 27–17	4–5	San Diego Stadium	26,048
10	November 23	at Atlanta Falcons	**L** 21–35	4–6	Atlanta–Fulton County Stadium	28,686
11	November 30	**San Diego Chargers**	**W** 13–10 (OT)	5–6	Mile High Stadium	44,982
12	December 8	at **Oakland Raiders**	**L** 10–17	5–7	Oakland–Alameda County Coliseum	51,075
13	December 14	Philadelphia Eagles	**W** 25–10	6–7	Mile High Stadium	36,860
14	December 20	at Miami Dolphins	**L** 13–14	6–8	Orange Bowl	43,064
Note: Intra-division opponents are in **bold** text.

=== Game summaries ===
==== Week 2 ====
Team	1	2	3	4	Total
Packers	0	0	0	13	13
• Broncos	0	6	7	10	23

- Date: September 29
- Location:
  Mile High Stadium, Denver, Colorado
- Game start:
  7:00 p.m. MDT
- Game attendance: 52,621
- Game weather: 57 °F (14 °C); wind 11 mph (18 km/h)
- Television network: ABC

Scoring summary
2	DEN	Jim Turner 35 yard field goal	DEN 3–0
2	DEN	Jim Turner 39 yard field goal	DEN 6–0
3	DEN	Jack Dolbin 10 yard pass from Steve Ramsey (Jim Turner kick)	DEN 13–0
4	GB	Willard Harrell 4 yard pass from John Hadl (kick failed)	DEN 13–6
4	DEN	Jim Turner 32 yard field goal	DEN 16–6
4	GB	John Brockington 1 yard run (Dave Pureifory kick)	DEN 16–13
4	DEN	Randy Gradishar 44 yard interception return (Jim Turner kick)	DEN 23–13

=== Standings ===
AFC West
	W	L	T	PCT	DIV	CONF	PF	PA	STK
^{(2)} Oakland Raiders	11	3	0	.786	5–1	8–3	375	255	W1
Denver Broncos	6	8	0	.429	3–3	4–7	254	307	L1
Kansas City Chiefs	5	9	0	.357	3–3	3–8	282	341	L4
San Diego Chargers	2	12	0	.143	1–5	2–9	189	345	L1
