= 1974 New Mexico Lobos football team =

American college football season

1974 New Mexico Lobos football
- Conference: Western Athletic Conference
- Record: 4–6–1 (3–4 WAC)
- Head coach: Bill Mondt (1st season)
- Home stadium: University Stadium

1974 Western Athletic Conference football standings
	Conf.					Overall
Team	W		L		T	W		L		T
BYU $	6	–	0	–	1	7	–	4	–	1
Arizona	6	–	1	–	0	9	–	2	–	0
Arizona State	4	–	3	–	0	7	–	5	–	0
New Mexico	3	–	4	–	0	4	–	6	–	1
UTEP	3	–	4	–	0	4	–	7	–	0
Colorado State	2	–	3	–	1	4	–	6	–	1
Utah	1	–	5	–	0	1	–	10	–	0
Wyoming	1	–	6	–	0	2	–	9	–	0
$ – Conference champion

The 1974 New Mexico Lobos football team was an American football team that represented the University of New Mexico in the Western Athletic Conference (WAC) during the 1974 NCAA Division I football season. In their first season under head coach Bill Mondt, the Lobos compiled a 4–6–1 record (3–4 against WAC opponents) and were outscored by a total of 263 to 192.

The team's statistical leaders included Steve Myer with 1,103 passing yards, Floyd Perry with 294 rushing yards, and Ken Lege with 249 receiving yards and 36 points scored.

== Schedule ==
Date	Opponent	Site	Result	Attendance	Source
September 14	Colorado State	University Stadium; Albuquerque, NM	W 32–23	16,308	
September 21	Texas Tech*	University Stadium; Albuquerque, NM	T 21–21	17,719	
September 28	No. 15 Arizona	University Stadium; Albuquerque, NM (rivalry)	L 10–15	24,404	
October 5	at Iowa State*	Clyde Williams Field; Ames, IA	L 3–27	31,529	
October 12	San Jose State*^{†}	University Stadium; Albuquerque, NM	L 11–13	15,974	
October 19	at Wyoming	War Memorial Stadium; Laramie, WY	W 32–21	16,168	
October 26	at No. 14 Arizona State	Sun Devil Stadium; Tempe, AZ	L 7–41	45,487	
November 2	New Mexico State*	University Stadium; Albuquerque, NM (rivalry)	W 26–24	16,496	
November 9	at Utah	Robert Rice Stadium; Salt Lake City, UT	L 10–21	12,263	
November 16	BYU	University Stadium; Albuquerque, NM	L 3–36	12,672	
November 23	at UTEP	Sun Bowl; El Paso, TX	W 37–21	16,930	
*Non-conference game; ^{†}Homecoming; Rankings from AP Poll released prior to the game

== Roster ==
1974 New Mexico Lobos football team roster
Players
Coaches
Offense

Pos.	#	Name	Class
OT	70	Mike Andrakowicz	So
G	76	Edger Bell	Jr
G	53	Ken Brown	Jr
G	68	David Cook	Sr
WR	80	Preston Dennard	Fr
RB	23	Howard Jones	Jr
TE	24	Gary McAlister	Jr
G	62	Tom Morris	So
QB	11	Steve Myer	Jr
WR	25	Jim Steinbaugh	Jr
WR	88	Gil Stewart	Jr
C	63	Steve Wilson	Jr

Defense

Pos.	#	Name	Class
DB	40	Ken Bryant	Fr
DE	90	Robin Cole	So
DE	45	David Cooksey	So
DE	60	Tom Fort	So
DT	73	Andy Frederick	So
S	36	Jerry Jackson	So
DB	22	Bob Johnson	Jr
DE	81	Greg Jones	Sr
DE	71	Kirk Nelson	So
CB	13	John Obringer	So
FS	18	Randy Rich	Jr
LB	66	Mark Rupcich	Jr
LB	51	David Thompson	So
CB	20	Ronnie Wallace	Jr

Special teams

Pos.	#	Name	Class
K	87	Bo Breg	Jr

Head coach

- Bill Mondt

Coordinators/assistant coaches

Legend

- (C) Team captain
- (S) Suspended
- (I) Ineligible
- Injured
- Redshirt
