= Harvey Goodman =

Harvey Goodman may refer to:

- Harvey Goodman (weightlifter)
- Harvey Goodman (American football)
