= 1974 Utah Utes football team =

American college football season

1974 Utah Utes football
- Conference: Western Athletic Conference
- Record: 1–10 (1–5 WAC)
- Head coach: Tom Lovat (1st season)
- Offensive coordinator: Jesse Cone (1st season)
- Defensive coordinator: Don McCaulley (1st season)
- Home stadium: Robert Rice Stadium

1974 Western Athletic Conference football standings
	Conf.					Overall
Team	W		L		T	W		L		T
BYU $	6	–	0	–	1	7	–	4	–	1
Arizona	6	–	1	–	0	9	–	2	–	0
Arizona State	4	–	3	–	0	7	–	5	–	0
New Mexico	3	–	4	–	0	4	–	6	–	1
UTEP	3	–	4	–	0	4	–	7	–	0
Colorado State	2	–	3	–	1	4	–	6	–	1
Utah	1	–	5	–	0	1	–	10	–	0
Wyoming	1	–	6	–	0	2	–	9	–	0
$ – Conference champion

The 1974 Utah Utes football team was an American football team that represented the University of Utah as a member of the Western Athletic Conference (WAC) during the 1974 NCAA Division I football season. In their first season under head coach Tom Lovat, the Utes compiled an overall record of 1–10 with a mark of 1–5 against conference opponents, placing seventh in the WAC. Home games were played on campus at Robert Rice Stadium in Salt Lake City.

== Schedule ==
Date	Opponent	Site	Result	Attendance	Source
September 21	at UTEP	Sun Bowl; El Paso, TX	L 7–34	17,841	
September 28	Oregon*	Robert Rice Stadium; Salt Lake City, UT	L 16–23	23,420	
October 5	UCLA*	Robert Rice Stadium; Salt Lake City, UT	L 14–27	25,682	
October 12	No. 12 Arizona	Robert Rice Stadium; Salt Lake City, UT	L 8–41	24,082	
October 19	at No. 15 Arizona State	Sun Devil Stadium; Tempe, AZ	L 0–32	48,260	
October 26	at Wyoming	War Memorial Stadium; Laramie, WY	L 13–31	11,992	
November 2	San Jose State*^{†}	Robert Rice Stadium; Salt Lake City, UT	L 6–24	14,327	
November 9	New Mexico	Robert Rice Stadium; Salt Lake City, UT	W 21–10	12,263	
November 16	at Utah State*	Maverik Stadium; Logan, UT (rivalry)	L 0–34	15,429	
November 23	at BYU	Cougar Stadium; Provo, UT (rivalry)	L 20–48	30,978	
November 30	at LSU*	Tiger Stadium; Baton Rouge, LA	L 10–35	55,573	
*Non-conference game; ^{†}Homecoming; Rankings from AP Poll released prior to the game

== Roster ==
1974 Utah Utes football team roster
Players
Coaches
Offense

Pos.	#	Name	Class
WR	45	Willie Armstead	Sr
OT	77	Mark Buchi	Sr
C	53	Rod Buntjer	Jr
OT	71	Dave Dahl	Sr
QB	14	Jim Miller	So
QB	13	Lou Onofrio	Jr
QB	11	Dan Payne	Sr
RB	22	Ike Spencer	Sr

Defense

Pos.	#	Name	Class
DB	29	Dan Allen	Sr
DB	28	Dan Clark	So
LB	58	John Huddleston	Jr
DT	39	Pat Kons	So
DE	93	Scott Reed	Sr
DB	21	Terry Taylor	So
DB	40	Larry Wall	So
DT	78	Mike Webb	So

Special teams

Pos.	#	Name	Class
K	90	Mike Brown	Jr
K	45	Craig Buchi	So

Head coach

- Tom Lovat

Coordinators/assistant coaches

Legend

- (C) Team captain
- (S) Suspended
- (I) Ineligible
- Injured
- Redshirt

== NFL draft ==
Two Utes were selected in the 1975 NFL draft, which lasted 17 rounds (442 selections).

Player	Position	Round	Pick	NFL team
Ike Spencer	Running back	11	285	Minnesota Vikings
Willie Armstead	Wide receiver	13	317	Cleveland Browns
