= 1974 Fiesta Bowl =

American college football game

- 4th Fiesta Bowl
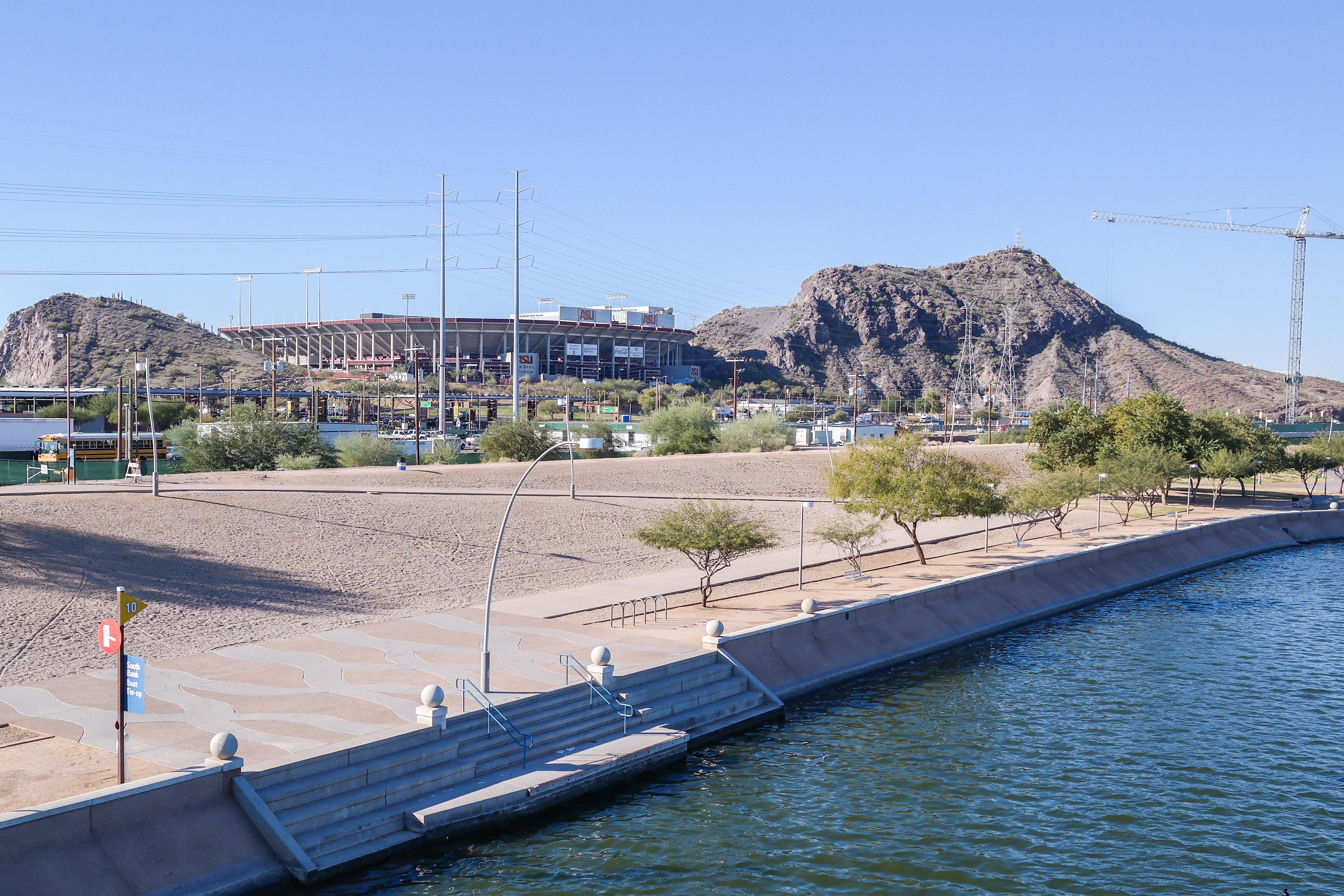
- Sun Devil Stadium in Tempe, Arizona, hosted the Fiesta Bowl.
Oklahoma State Cowboys	BYU Cougars
(6–5)	(7–3–1)
Big 8	WAC
16	6
Head coach: Jim Stanley	Head coach: LaVell Edwards
AP / Coaches; NR / NR	AP / Coaches; 17 / 15
	1	2	3	4	Total
Oklahoma State	0	7	3	6	16
BYU	6	0	0	0	6
- Date: December 28, 1974
- Season: 1974
- Stadium: Sun Devil Stadium
- Location: Tempe, Arizona
- MVP: Kenny Walker (OSU RB); Phil Dokes (OSU DT)
- Favorite: BYU
- Attendance: 50,878
- Payout: US$201,898 each

United States TV coverage
- Network: CBS
- Announcers: Ray Scott, Wayne Walker

The 1974 Fiesta Bowl was the fourth edition of the college football bowl game, played at Sun Devil Stadium in Tempe, Arizona on Saturday, December 28. Part of the 1974–75 bowl game season, it matched the unranked Oklahoma State Cowboys of the Big Eight Conference and #17 BYU Cougars of the Western Athletic Conference (WAC). After falling behind early, underdog Oklahoma State won 16–6.

== Teams ==
The 1974 Fiesta Bowl featured the Oklahoma State Cowboys from the Big Eight Conference (Big 8) and the no. 17 BYU Cougars from the Western Athletic Conference (WAC). This was the first Fiesta Bowl appearance for both teams, with this being the first bowl appearance in program history for BYU.

=== Oklahoma State ===
Led by second-year head coach Jim Stanley, Oklahoma State entered the game with an overall record of 6–5, going 4–3 in Big 8 play to finish fourth in the conference. The Cowboys went 1–3 against AP-ranked opponents, defeating no. 10 Arkansas, with losses to no. 10 Texas Tech, no. 9 Nebraska, and no. 1 Oklahoma

=== BYU ===
Led by third-year head coach LaVell Edwards, BYU entered the game with an overall record of 7–3–1, going 6–0–1 in WAC play to finish first in the conference. The Cougars started the season with a record of 0–3–1 before winning seven games in a row. BYU went 2–0 against AP-ranked opponents, defeating Arizona and Arizona State, who were both ranked 16 in their respective games against BYU. The Cougars were ranked no. 17 entering the Fiesta Bowl.

== Game summary ==
The kickoff was shortly after 2 p.m. MST, following the Sun Bowl, both televised by CBS. The weather in Tempe was cloudy with light rain.

A shoulder injury to BYU quarterback Gary Sheide late in the first quarter led to a defensive battle. After completing four of five passes for 43 yards and leading the Cougars to two field goals, he was knocked out of the game, hit from behind by Cowboy defensive lineman Phil Dokes.

Oklahoma State quickly took advantage, as Tony Buck returned an interception of BYU backup Mark Giles to the Cougar 26-yard line. Three plays later, Kenny Walker took a pitch and raced around the left end for a twelve-yard touchdown run to lead by a point at halftime.

Oklahoma State scored again in the third quarter on a 42-yard field goal by Abby Daigle to take a 10–6 lead. With under ten minutes left in the game, BYU began a long drive from their own two. Giles marched his club all the way to the OSU 28 on short passes and runs, but turned the ball over on downs when a fourth down pass fell incomplete. The Cowboys then took control of the ball and clock and scored with 1:14 remaining on a forty-yard halfback pass play from Leonard Thompson to Gerald Bain.

Walker finished with 34 yards rushing and was named the offensive player of the game; Dokes took the defensive honor.

=== Scoring ===
1974 Fiesta Bowl

Quarter	1	2	3	4	Total
Cowboys	0	7	3	6	16
No. 17 Cougars	6	0	0	0	6

at Sun Devil Stadium, Tempe, Arizona

- Date: Saturday, December 28, 1974
- Game time: 2:00 p.m. MST
- Game weather: Cloudy with light rain
- Game attendance: 50,878
- TV announcers (CBS): Ray Scott and Wayne Walker

Game information
First quarter
- BYU – Mark Uselman 30-yard field goal, 9:34. Cougars 3–0.
- BYU – Mark Uselman 30-yard field goal, 0:33. Cougars 6–0.

Second quarter

- OKST – Kenny Walker 12-yard run (Abby Daigle kick), 7:34. Cowboys 7–6.

Third quarter

- OKST – Abby Daigle 41-yard field goal, 6:02. Cowboys 10–6.

Fourth quarter

- OKST – Leonard Thompson 40-yard pass from Charlie Weatherbie (kick failed), 1:14. Cowboys 16–6.

== Statistics ==
Statistics	OKST	BYU
First downs	14	17
Rushes–yards	55–147	36–120
Passing yards	77	181
Passing: comp–att–int	7–18–0	15–31–3
Return yards	64	3
Plays–yards	73–224	67–301
Punts–average	7–41.9	6–41.8
Fumbles–lost	6–0	3–1
Turnovers	0	4
Penalties–yards	12–84	9–66
Time of possession	31:09	28:51

Team	Category	Player	Statistics
Oklahoma State	Passing	Charlie Weatherbie	6/16, 64 yards, TD
Oklahoma State	Rushing	Kenny Walker	6 rushes, 34 yards, TD
Oklahoma State	Receiving	Leonard Thompson	3 receptions, 42 yards, TD
BYU	Passing	Mark Giles	12/27, 138 yards, 3 INT
BYU	Rushing	Jeff Blanc	19 rushes, 53 yards
BYU	Receiving	Sam LoBue	3 receptions, 50 yards
