= Brent Adams (American football) =

American football player (born 1952)

No. 61, 62
- Position: Tackle

Personal information
- Born: June 26, 1952 (age 74); Elberton, Georgia, U.S.
- Listed height: 6 ft 5 in (1.96 m)
- Listed weight: 256 lb (116 kg)

Career information
- High school: Elbert County (GA)
- College: Chattanooga
- NFL draft: 1975: 8th round, 185th overall pick

Career history
- Atlanta Falcons (1975–1978)

Career NFL statistics
- Games played: 41
- Games started: 39
- Stats at Pro Football Reference

David Brent Adams (born June 26, 1952) is an American former professional football player who was an offensive tackle in the National Football League (NFL). He played college football for the Chattanooga Mocs, where he was a four-year starter, and later professionally for the Atlanta Falcons.

== Professional career ==
Adams was selected 185th overall by the Atlanta Falcons in the eighth round of the 1975 NFL draft and played for the team for three seasons. During the second day of the 1978 preseason, Adams suffered a partial tear of ligaments in his knee and was put on the injury list. That meant, that despite him being healthy to play by December, he had to sit the out season due to NFL rules. In August 1979, he was waived by the Falcons along with nine other players. In October the same year, he signed with the Los Angeles Rams.

== Personal life ==
Three of his older brothers played college sports. Larry played basketball at West Georgia, Jerry who was a cross-country runner at Georgia Tech and Bob, who played college football at Chattanooga.
