= 1974 Wyoming Cowboys football team =

American college football season

1974 Wyoming Cowboys football
- Conference: Western Athletic Conference
- Record: 2–9 (1–6 WAC)
- Head coach: Fritz Shurmur (4th season)
- Captains: Al Duyn; Mike Lopiccolo; Tony Williams
- Home stadium: War Memorial Stadium

1974 Western Athletic Conference football standings
	Conf.					Overall
Team	W		L		T	W		L		T
BYU $	6	–	0	–	1	7	–	4	–	1
Arizona	6	–	1	–	0	9	–	2	–	0
Arizona State	4	–	3	–	0	7	–	5	–	0
New Mexico	3	–	4	–	0	4	–	6	–	1
UTEP	3	–	4	–	0	4	–	7	–	0
Colorado State	2	–	3	–	1	4	–	6	–	1
Utah	1	–	5	–	0	1	–	10	–	0
Wyoming	1	–	6	–	0	2	–	9	–	0
$ – Conference champion

The 1974 Wyoming Cowboys football team was an American football team that represented the University of Wyoming as a member of the Western Athletic Conference (WAC) during the 1974 NCAA Division I football season. In their fourth year under head coach Fritz Shurmur, the Cowboys compiled a 2–9 record (1–6 against conference opponents), finished last out of eight teams in the WAC, and were outscored by a total of 283 to 150. They played their home games at War Memorial Stadium in Laramie, Wyoming.

== Schedule ==
Date	Opponent	Site	Result	Attendance	Source
September 14	Utah State*	War Memorial Stadium; Laramie, WY	L 7–17	20,267	
September 21	at No. 9 Texas*	Memorial Stadium; Austin, TX	L 7–34	52,800	
September 28	Air Force*	War Memorial Stadium; Laramie, WY	W 20–16	18,631	
October 5	No. 18 Arizona State	War Memorial Stadium; Laramie, WY	L 10–16	18,675	
October 12	at BYU	Cougar Stadium; Provo, UT	L 7–38	29,555	
October 19	New Mexico	War Memorial Stadium; Laramie, WY	L 21–32	16,168	
October 26	Utah	War Memorial Stadium; Laramie, WY	W 31–13	11,992	
November 2	at Colorado State	Hughes Stadium; Fort Collins, CO (rivalry)	L 6–11	19,555	
November 9	at UTEP	Sun Bowl; El Paso, TX	L 13–35	23,875	
November 16	Pacific (CA)*	War Memorial Stadium; Laramie, WY	L 14–50	9,672	
November 23	at Arizona	Arizona Stadium; Tucson, AZ	L 14–21	34,467	
*Non-conference game; Rankings from AP Poll released prior to the game
