= 1974 UTEP Miners football team =

American college football season

1974 UTEP Miners football
- Conference: Western Athletic Conference
- Record: 4–7 (3–4 WAC)
- Head coach: Gil Bartosh (1st season)
- Home stadium: Sun Bowl

1974 Western Athletic Conference football standings
	Conf.					Overall
Team	W		L		T	W		L		T
BYU $	6	–	0	–	1	7	–	4	–	1
Arizona	6	–	1	–	0	9	–	2	–	0
Arizona State	4	–	3	–	0	7	–	5	–	0
New Mexico	3	–	4	–	0	4	–	6	–	1
UTEP	3	–	4	–	0	4	–	7	–	0
Colorado State	2	–	3	–	1	4	–	6	–	1
Utah	1	–	5	–	0	1	–	10	–	0
Wyoming	1	–	6	–	0	2	–	9	–	0
$ – Conference champion

The 1974 UTEP Miners football team was an American football team that represented the University of Texas at El Paso (UTEP) as a member of the Western Athletic Conference (WAC) during the 1974 NCAA Division I football season. In their first season under head coach Gil Bartosh, the miners compiled a 4–7 record.

== Schedule ==
Date	Opponent	Site	Result	Attendance	Source
September 14	Pacific (CA)*	Sun Bowl; El Paso, TX	L 14–17	15,464	
September 21	Utah	Sun Bowl; El Paso, TX	W 34–7	17,841	
September 28	San Diego State*	Sun Bowl; El Paso, TX	L 12–26	22,785	
October 5	at No. 12 Arizona	Arizona Stadium; Tucson, AZ	L 13–42	38,051	
October 12	at New Mexico State*	Memorial Stadium; Las Cruces, NM (rivalry)	L 13–14	14,500	
October 19	at BYU	Cougar Stadium; Provo, UT	L 21–45	19,628	
October 26	at UT Arlington*	Arlington Stadium; Arlington, TX	W 28–14	4,600	
November 2	at No. 14 Arizona State	Sun Devil Stadium; Tempe, AZ	W 31–27	46,500	
November 9	Wyoming^{†}	Sun Bowl; El Paso, TX	W 35–13	23,875	
November 16	at Colorado State	Hughes Stadium; Fort Collins, CO	L 24–56	16,883	
November 23	New Mexico	Sun Bowl; El Paso, TX	L 21–37	16,930	
*Non-conference game; ^{†}Homecoming; Rankings from AP Poll released prior to the game
