= 1974 San Diego State Aztecs football team =

American college football season

1974 San Diego State Aztecs football

PCAA champion
- Conference: Pacific Coast Athletic Association
- Record: 8–2–1 (4–0 PCAA)
- Head coach: Claude Gilbert (2nd season)
- Offensive coordinator: Ted Tollner (2nd season)
- Offensive scheme: Pro-style
- Base defense: 4–3
- Home stadium: San Diego Stadium

1974 Pacific Coast Athletic Association football standings
	Conf.					Overall
Team	W		L		T	W		L		T
San Diego State $	4	–	0	–	0	8	–	2	–	1
San Jose State	2	–	2	–	0	8	–	3	–	1
Pacific (CA)	2	–	2	–	0	6	–	5	–	0
Long Beach State	1	–	3	–	0	6	–	5	–	0
Fresno State	1	–	3	–	0	5	–	7	–	0
Cal State Fullerton	0	–	0	–	0	4	–	6	–	0
$ – Conference champion

The 1974 San Diego State Aztecs football team represented San Diego State University during the 1974 NCAA Division I football season as a member of the Pacific Coast Athletic Association. (Note: The Big West Conference was known as the Pacific Coast Athletic Association from its founding in 1969 through 1987.)

The team was led by head coach Claude Gilbert, in his second year, and played home games at San Diego Stadium (Note: San Diego County Credit Union Stadium (SDCCU Stadium) was known as San Diego Stadium from its opening in 1967 through 1980.) in San Diego, California. They finished the season as Conference Champion for the third consecutive year, with a record of eight wins, two losses and one tie (8–2–1, 4–0 PCAA).

== Schedule ==
Date	Opponent	Rank	Site	Result	Attendance	Source
September 14	at 17 Arizona*		Arizona Stadium; Tucson, AZ	L 10–17	38,914	
September 21	Tampa*		San Diego Stadium; San Diego, CA	W 28–25	30,639	
September 28	at UTEP*		Sun Bowl; El Paso, TX	W 26–12	22,785	
October 12	Fresno State		San Diego Stadium; San Diego, CA (rivalry)	W 24–21	35,394	
October 19	San Jose State^{†}		San Diego Stadium; San Diego, CA	W 40–14	33,714	
October 26	Long Beach State		San Diego Stadium; San Diego, CA	W 27–17	27,775	
November 2	at North Texas State*	No. 20	Fouts Field; Denton, TX	L 9–14	3,100	
November 9	Pacific (CA)		San Diego Stadium; San Diego, CA	W 37–9	27,049	
November 16	New Mexico State*		San Diego Stadium; San Diego, CA	W 35–14	26,722	
November 23	Bowling Green*		San Diego Stadium; San Diego, CA	T 21–21	24,178	
November 30	Utah State*		San Diego Stadium; San Diego, CA	W 34–6	24,687	
*Non-conference game; ^{†}Homecoming; Rankings from AP Poll released prior to the game

== Team players in the NFL ==
The following were selected in the 1975 NFL draft.

Player	Position	Round	Overall	NFL team
Monte Jackson	Defensive Back	2	28	Los Angeles Rams

The following finished their college career in 1974, were not drafted, but played in the NFL.

Player	Position	First NFL Team
Benny Ricardo	Kicker	1976 Buffalo Bills
Dwight McDonald	Wide Receiver	1975 San Diego Chargers

== Team awards ==
Award	Player
Most Valuable Player (John Simcox Memorial Trophy)	Dwight McDonald
Outstanding Offensive & Defensive Linemen (Byron H. Chase Memorial Trophy)	Tony Bachmann, Off; Bobby Henderson, Def
Team captains Dr. R. Hardy / C.E. Peterson Memorial Trophy	Bill Kramer, Off; Bobby Henderson, Def
Most Inspirational Player	Tim Delaney, Rance Olison
