= Larry Keller =

American football player (born 1953)

No. 56
- Position: Linebacker

Personal information
- Born: October 2, 1953 (age 73); San Benito, Texas, U.S.
- Listed height: 6 ft 2 in (1.88 m)
- Listed weight: 223 lb (101 kg)

Career information
- High school: Lutcher Stark (Orange, Texas)
- College: Houston (1971–1974)
- NFL draft: 1975: 9th round, 214th overall pick

Career history
- Hamilton Tiger-Cats (1975)*; Memphis Southmen (1975)*; San Diego Chargers (1976)*; New York Jets (1976–1979)
- * Offseason or practice squad member only

Career NFL statistics
- Sacks: 3.5
- Fumble recoveries: 7
- Interceptions: 3
- Stats at Pro Football Reference

Larry Ray Keller (born October 2, 1953) is an American former professional football player who was a linebacker for three seasons with the New York Jets of the National Football League (NFL). He played college football for the Houston Cougars and was selected by the San Diego Chargers in the ninth round of the 1975 NFL draft.

== Early life and college ==
Larry Ray Keller was born on October 2, 1953, in San Benito, Texas. He attended Lutcher Stark High School in Orange, Texas.

Keller was a member of the Cougars of the University of Houston from 1971 to 1974 and a three-year letterman from 1972 to 1974.

== Professional career ==
Keller was selected by the San Diego Chargers in the ninth round, with the 214th overall pick, of the 1975 NFL draft. However, he instead signed with the Hamilton Tiger-Cats of the Canadian Football League (CFL). He was cut by the Tiger-Cats on July 17, 1975, before the start of the 1975 CFL season.

Keller signed with the Memphis Southmen of the World Football League (WFL) on July 22, 1975. On July 31, 1975, it was reported that he had been waived by the Southmen before the start of the 1975 WFL season.

Keller finally signed with the Chargers on April 7, 1976. However, he was later waived on September 7, 1976.

Keller was claimed off waivers by the New York Jets on September 8, 1976. He played in all 14 games, starting two, for the Jets during the 1976 season, recording 0.5 sacks, one interception, and three fumble recoveries. He appeared in all 14 games for the second consecutive season, starting nine, in 1977, totaling one sack, one interception, two fumble recoveries, and one carry for 25 yards. Keller played in all 16 games, starting eight, in 1978, recording two sacks, one interception, and two fumble recoveries. He was placed on injured reserve on August 14, 1979, and missed the entire 1979 season. Keller retired on July 23, 1980.
