= 1974 Air Force Falcons football team =

American college football season

1974 Air Force Falcons football
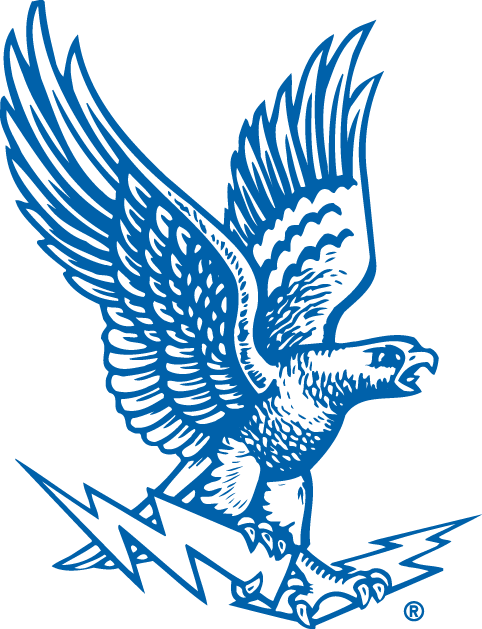
- Conference: Independent
- Record: 2–9
- Head coach: Ben Martin (17th season)
- Captains: Larry Fariss; Terry Young
- Home stadium: Falcon Stadium

1974 NCAA Division I independents football records
	Conf.			Overall
Team	W	L	T	W		L		T
No. 6 Notre Dame		–		10	–	2	–	0
No. 7 Penn State		–		10	–	2	–	0
Temple		–		8	–	2	–	0
Boston College		–		8	–	3	–	0
Utah State		–		8	–	3	–	0
No. 19 Houston		–		8	–	3	–	1
Rutgers		–		7	–	3	–	1
Cincinnati		–		7	–	4	–	0
Memphis State		–		7	–	4	–	0
Pittsburgh		–		7	–	4	–	0
Georgia Tech		–		6	–	5	–	0
Hawaii		–		6	–	5	–	0
Miami (FL)		–		6	–	5	–	0
Southern Miss		–		6	–	5	–	0
Tampa		–		6	–	5	–	0
Holy Cross		–		5	–	5	–	1
Tulane		–		5	–	6	–	0
Colgate		–		4	–	6	–	0
Northern Illinois		–		4	–	7	–	0
Navy		–		4	–	7	–	0
South Carolina		–		4	–	7	–	0
Virginia Tech		–		4	–	7	–	0
West Virginia		–		4	–	7	–	0
Army		–		3	–	8	–	0
Dayton		–		3	–	8	–	0
Villanova		–		3	–	8	–	0
Air Force		–		2	–	9	–	0
Southern Illinois		–		2	–	9	–	0
Syracuse		–		2	–	9	–	0
Florida State		–		1	–	10	–	0
Marshall		–		1	–	10	–	0
Rankings from AP Poll

The 1974 Air Force Falcons football team represented the United States Air Force Academy as an independent during the 1974 NCAA Division I football season. Led by 17th-year head coach Ben Martin, the Falcons compiled a record of 2–9 and were outscored by their opponents 215 to 178. Air Force played home games at Falcon Stadium in Colorado Springs, Colorado.

== Schedule ==
Date	Opponent	Site	Result	Attendance	Source
September 14	Idaho	Falcon Stadium; Colorado Springs, CO	W 37–0	32,364	
September 21	at Oregon	Autzen Stadium; Eugene, OR	L 23–27	23,500	
September 28	at Wyoming	War Memorial Stadium; Laramie, WY	L 16–20	18,631	
October 5	Colorado	Falcon Stadium; Colorado Springs, CO	L 27–28	38,354	
October 12	Tulane	Falcon Stadium; Colorado Springs, CO	L 3–10		
October 19	Navy	Falcon Stadium; Colorado Springs, CO (Commander-in-Chief's Trophy)	W 19–16	35,673	
October 26	at Rutgers	Rutgers Stadium; Piscataway, NJ	L 3–20	18,000	
November 2	BYU	Falcon Stadium; Colorado Springs, CO	L 10–12	24,204	
November 9	at Army	Michie Stadium; West Point, NY (Commander-in-Chief's Trophy)	L 16–17	42,521	
November 16	Arizona	Falcon Stadium; Colorado Springs, CO	L 24–27	34,802	
November 23	at No. 5 Notre Dame	Notre Dame Stadium; South Bend, IN (rivalry)	L 0–38	59,075	
Rankings from AP Poll released prior to the game
