= 1975 Oakland Raiders season =

NFL team season

- Owner: Al Davis
- General manager: Al Davis
- Head coach: John Madden
- Home stadium: Oakland–Alameda County Coliseum

Results
- Record: 11–3
- Division place: 1st AFC West
- Playoffs: Won Divisional Playoffs (vs. Bengals) 31–28; Lost AFC Championship (at Steelers) 10–16

The 1975 Oakland Raiders season was the team's 16th season, and 6th in the National Football League.

The 1975 season was George Blanda's final season in the NFL. Blanda retired with two significant records: the most seasons in American professional football (26), and most games played (340). The Raiders finished the season with an 11–3 record and won the AFC West for the 4th straight year. They also made the playoffs for the 4th straight season. In the playoffs, the Raiders stunned the Cincinnati Bengals 31–28 in the Divisional Round. In the AFC Championship game, their third straight, they lost to the Steelers for the second straight season 16–10.

Opposing quarterbacks had a passer rating of 37.2 against Oakland in 1975, the second-lowest total of the Super Bowl era. The Raiders defeated the Dolphins to win their season opener for the first time since 1969.

== Offseason ==
=== NFL draft ===
1975 Oakland Raiders Draft
Round	Selection	Selection	Player	Position	College
1	24	24	Neal Colzie	Ohio State	DB
2	19	45	Charlie Phillips	USC	DB
3	24	76	Louis Carter	Maryland	RB
5	24	128	David Humm	Nebraska	QB
7	24	180	James Daniels	Texas A&M	DB
9	24	232	Harry Knight	Richmond	QB
10	25	259	Steve Sylvester	Notre Dame	T
12	24	310	Jack Magee	Boston College	C
14	24	362	Tom Doyle	Yale	QB
15	25	389	Paul Careathers	Tennessee	RB

== Personnel ==
=== Staff / Coaches ===
1975 Oakland Raiders staff
Front office: Principal Owner/General Manager - Al Davis; Minority Co-Owner - Eddie McGah; Minority Co-Owner - F. Wayne Valley; President of the General Partner / General Manager – Al Davis; Senior Executive – John Herrera; Scout/ Executive assistant, Personnel Director - Ken Herock; Executive Assistant / Scout - Al LoCasale; Head coaches: Head Coach – John Madden; Assistant Head Coach / Executive Assistant - Tom Flores; Offensive coaches: Offensive Backs – John Robinson; Receivers Coach – Tom Flores; Offensive line – Ollie Spencer	Defensive coaches: Defensive Line – Tom Dahms; Linebackers – Don Shinnick; Defensive Backfield – Bob Zeman; Special teams coaches: Special teams – None - N/A

=== Roster ===
1975 Oakland Raiders roster
Quarterbacks (QB): 11 David Humm; 12 Ken Stabler; Running backs (RB): 40 Pete Banaszak; 28 Clarence Davis; 34 Harold Hart; 44 Marv Hubbard; 35 Jess Phillips; 30 Mark van Eeghen; Wide receivers (WR): 25 Fred Biletnikoff; 81 Morris Bradshaw; 21 Cliff Branch; 49 Mike Siani; Tight ends (TE): 46 Warren Bankston; 87 Dave Casper; 89 Ted Kwalick; 88 Bob Moore	Offensive linemen (OL): 64 George Buehler G; 50 Dave Dalby C; 70 Henry Lawrence T; 79 Dan Medlin G; 78 Art Shell T; 66 Steve Sylvester C; 63 Gene Upshaw G; 75 John Vella T; Defensive linemen (DL): 84 Tony Cline DE; 82 Horace Jones DE; 74 Dave Rowe DT; 60 Otis Sistrunk DT; 80 Art Thoms DT	Linebackers (LB): 54 Mike Dennery MLB; 39 Willie Hall OLB; 83 Ted Hendricks OLB/DE; 86 Gerald Irons OLB; 58 Monte Johnson MLB; 41 Phil Villapiano OLB; Defensive backs (DB): 43 George Atkinson SS; 24 Willie Brown CB; 20 Neal Colzie CB; 47 Charlie Phillips FS; 32 Jack Tatum FS; 26 Skip Thomas CB; Special teams (ST): 16 George Blanda K; 8 Ray Guy P	Reserve: 33 Louis Carter RB (IR); 71 Kelvin Korver DT (IR); 13 Larry Lawrence QB (IR); 37 Mike Reinfeldt S (IR); Rookies in italics

== Regular season ==
=== Schedule ===
Week	Date	Opponent	Result	Record	Venue	Recap
1	September 22	at Miami Dolphins	**W** 31–21	1–0	Miami Orange Bowl	Recap
2	September 28	at Baltimore Colts	**W** 31–20	2–0	Memorial Stadium	Recap
3	October 5	at **San Diego Chargers**	**W** 6–0	3–0	San Diego Stadium	Recap
4	October 12	at **Kansas City Chiefs**	**L** 10–42	3–1	Arrowhead Stadium	Recap
5	October 19	at Cincinnati Bengals	**L** 10–14	3–2	Riverfront Stadium	Recap
6	October 26	**San Diego Chargers**	**W** 25–0	4–2	Oakland–Alameda County Coliseum	Recap
7	November 2	at **Denver Broncos**	**W** 42–17	5–2	Mile High Stadium	Recap
8	November 9	New Orleans Saints	**W** 48–10	6–2	Oakland–Alameda County Coliseum	Recap
9	November 16	Cleveland Browns	**W** 38–17	7–2	Oakland–Alameda County Coliseum	Recap
10	November 23	at Washington Redskins	**W** 26–23	8–2	Robert F. Kennedy Memorial Stadium	Recap
11	November 30	Atlanta Falcons	**W** 37–34	9–2	Oakland–Alameda County Coliseum	Recap
12	December 8	**Denver Broncos**	**W** 17–10	10–2	Oakland–Alameda County Coliseum	Recap
13	December 14	Houston Oilers	**L** 26–27	10–3	Oakland–Alameda County Coliseum	Recap
14	December 21	**Kansas City Chiefs**	**W** 28–20	11–3	Oakland–Alameda County Coliseum	Recap
Note: Intra-division opponents are in **bold** text.

=== Season summary ===
==== Week 10 ====
Team	1	2	3	4	OT	Total
• **Raiders**	6	14	0	3	3	26
Redskins	0	9	7	7	0	23

- Date: November 23
- Location: RFK Stadium • Washington, D.C.
- Game start: 4:00 p.m. EST
- Game weather: 41 °F (5 °C) • Wind 10 mph (16 km/h)
- Referee: Pat Haggerty
- TV announcers (NBC): Curt Gowdy, Don Meredith

Scoring summary
1	OAK	Pete Banaszak 1-yard run (kick failed)	Raiders 6–0
2	WSH	Charley Taylor 8-yard pass from Billy Kilmer (kick failed)	Tie 6–6
2	WSH	Mark Moseley 34-yard field goal	Redskins 9–6
2	OAK	Pete Banaszak 27-yard run (George Blanda kick)	Raiders 13–9
2	OAK	Pete Banaszak 7-yard run (George Blanda kick)	Raiders 20–9
3	WSH	Mike Thomas 2-yard run (Mark Moseley kick)	Raiders 20–16
4	OAK	George Blanda 22-yard field goal	Raiders 23–16
4	WSH	Frank Grant 33-yard pass from Billy Kilmer (Mark Moseley kick)	Tie 23–23
OT	OAK	George Blanda 27-yard field goal	Raiders 26–23

=== Standings ===
AFC West
	W	L	T	PCT	DIV	CONF	PF	PA	STK
Oakland Raiders^{(2)}	11	3	0	.786	5–1	8–3	375	255	W1
Denver Broncos	6	8	0	.429	3–3	4–7	254	307	L1
Kansas City Chiefs	5	9	0	.357	3–3	3–8	282	341	L4
San Diego Chargers	2	12	0	.143	1–5	2–9	189	345	L1

== Playoffs ==
The Raiders defeated the Cincinnati Bengals 31–28 in the divisional round in Oakland. The following Sunday, they fell to the Pittsburgh Steelers 16–10 in the AFC Championship Game.

=== Oakland Raiders 31, Cincinnati Bengals 28 ===
Game summary

Quarter	1	2	3	4	Total
Bengals	0	7	7	14	28
Raiders	3	14	7	7	31

at Oakland–Alameda County Coliseum, Oakland, California

- Date: December 28, 1975
- Game time: 4:00 p.m. EST/1:00 p.m. PST
- Game attendance: 53,030
- Referee: Jim Tunney
- TV announcers (NBC): Curt Gowdy and Al DeRogatis

Game information
- Scoring
  - OAK – field goal Blanda 31 OAK 3–0
  - OAK – Siani 9 pass from Stabler (Blanda kick) OAK 10–3
  - CIN – Fritts 1 run (Green kick) OAK 10–7
  - OAK – Moore 8 pass from Stabler (Blanda kick) OAK 17–7
  - OAK – Banaszak 6 run (Blanda kick) OAK 24–7
  - CIN – Elliott 6 run (Green kick) OAK 24–14
  - OAK – Casper 2 pass from Stabler (Blanda kick) OAK 31–14
  - CIN – Joiner 25 pass from Anderson (Green kick) OAK 31–21
  - CIN – Curtis 14 pass from Anderson (Green kick) OAK 31–28

Raiders go to the AFC Championship Game but lost to the eventual Super Bowl Champion Steelers 16-10.

=== Pittsburgh Steelers 16, Oakland Raiders 10 ===
Game summary

Quarter	1	2	3	4	Total
Raiders	0	0	0	10	10
Steelers	0	3	0	13	16

at Three Rivers Stadium, Pittsburgh, Pennsylvania

- Date: January 4, 1976
- Game time: 1:00 p.m. EST
- Game attendance: 50,609
- Referee: Ben Dreith
- TV announcers (NBC): Curt Gowdy, Al DeRogatis, and Don Meredith

Game information
- Scoring
  - PIT – field goal Gerela 36 PIT 3–0
  - PIT – Harris 25 run (Gerela kick) PIT 10–0
  - OAK – Siani 14 pass from Stabler (Blanda kick) PIT 10–7
  - PIT – Stallworth 20 pass from Bradshaw (kick failed) PIT 16–7
  - OAK – field goal Blanda 41 PIT 16–10

Raiders lost and in 1976 finished 13-1 they win over the New England Patriots 24-21 in the Divisional Round. In the AFC Championship Game win over the Steelers 24-7. And win in Super Bowl XI over the Minnesota Vikings 32-14.

== Awards and honors ==
- George Blanda, most seasons in American professional football (26)
- George Blanda, most games played, (340)
