= Archie Gray (American football) =

Former American football wide receiver

No. 17
- Position: Wide receiver

Personal information
- Born: March 13, 1953 (age 73); Omaha, Nebraska, U.S.
- Listed height: 6 ft 0 in (1.83 m)
- Listed weight: 180 lb (82 kg)

Career information
- High school: Omaha Benson (Omaha, NE)
- College: Wyoming (1971–1974)
- NFL draft: 1975: 10th round, 260th overall pick

Career history
- Montreal Alouettes (1977)

Archie Eugene Gray (born March 13, 1953) is a former American football wide receiver.

Gray was born in 1953 in Omaha, Nebraska. He attended Omaha Benson High School there.

Gray played college football for the Wyoming Cowboys from 1971 to 1974. As a junior in 1973, he ranked fourth nationally with 988 receiving yards and third nationally with an average of 24.7 yards per reception.

Gray was selected by the Pittsburgh Steelers in the 10th round of the 1975 NFL draft. He signed with the Steelers but was released before the regular season started. He also had preseason stints with the Detroit Lions in 1976 and the Los Angeles Rams in 1977. He played with the Montreal Alouettes of the Canadian Football League in 1977, tallying nine receptions for 136 yards. He concluded his professional football career with preseason stints with the Denver Broncos in 1979 and the Michigan Panthers of the USFL in 1984.

== See also ==
- Wyoming Cowboys football statistical leaders
