= 1974 BYU Cougars football team =

American college football season

1974 BYU Cougars football

WAC champion

Fiesta Bowl, L 6–16 vs. Oklahoma State
- Conference: Western Athletic Conference
- Record: 7–4–1 (6–0–1 WAC)
- Head coach: LaVell Edwards (3rd season)
- Offensive coordinator: Dave Kragthorpe (5th season)
- Offensive scheme: West Coast
- Defensive coordinator: Dick Felt (3rd season)
- Base defense: 4–3
- Home stadium: Cougar Stadium

1974 Western Athletic Conference football standings
	Conf.					Overall
Team	W		L		T	W		L		T
BYU $	6	–	0	–	1	7	–	4	–	1
Arizona	6	–	1	–	0	9	–	2	–	0
Arizona State	4	–	3	–	0	7	–	5	–	0
New Mexico	3	–	4	–	0	4	–	6	–	1
UTEP	3	–	4	–	0	4	–	7	–	0
Colorado State	2	–	3	–	1	4	–	6	–	1
Utah	1	–	5	–	0	1	–	10	–	0
Wyoming	1	–	6	–	0	2	–	9	–	0
$ – Conference champion

The 1974 BYU Cougars football team represented Brigham Young University during the 1974 NCAA Division I football season. The Cougars were led by third-year head coach LaVell Edwards and played their home games at Cougar Stadium in Provo, Utah. The team competed as a member of the Western Athletic Conference, winning the conference for the first time since 1965 with an undefeated conference record of 6–0–1. BYU was invited to the 1974 Fiesta Bowl, where they lost to Oklahoma State.

== Schedule ==
Date	Opponent	Rank	Site	Result	Attendance	Source
September 14	at Hawaii*		Honolulu Stadium; Honolulu, HI	L 13–15	23,000	
September 21	Utah State*		Cougar Stadium; Provo, UT	L 6–9	34,555	
September 28	at Iowa State*		Clyde Williams Field; Ames, IA	L 7–34	29,419–32,000	
October 5	at Colorado State		Hughes Stadium; Fort Collins, CO	T 33–33	17,458	
October 12	Wyoming^{†}		Cougar Stadium; Provo, UT	W 38–7	29,555	
October 19	UTEP		Cougar Stadium; Provo, UT	W 45–21	19,628	
October 26	at No. 16 Arizona		Arizona Stadium; Tucson, AZ	W 37–13	34,116	
November 2	at Air Force*		Falcon Stadium; Colorado Springs, CO	W 12–10	24,204	
November 9	No. 16 Arizona State		Cougar Stadium; Provo, UT	W 21–18	26,922	
November 16	at New Mexico		University Stadium; Albuquerque, NM	W 36–3	12,672	
November 23	Utah		Cougar Stadium; Provo, UT (Holy War)	W 48–20	30,978	
December 28	vs. Oklahoma State*	No. 17	Sun Devil Stadium; Tempe, AZ (Fiesta Bowl)	L 6–16	50,878	
*Non-conference game; ^{†}Homecoming; Rankings from AP Poll released prior to the game

== Game summaries ==
=== At Hawaii ===
	1	2	3	4	Total
Cougars	0	0	7	6	13
Rainbow Warriors	3	3	6	3	15

Team	Category	Player	Statistics
BYU	Passing	Gary Sheide	13/22, 154 yards, TD, 4 INT
BYU	Rushing	Jeff Blanc	31 rushes, 165 yards
BYU	Receiving	Craig Van Leeuwen	3 receptions, 62 yards
Hawaii	Passing	Alex Cloi	13/21, 167 yards, INT
Hawaii	Rushing	Arnold Morgado	19 rushes, 45 yards
Hawaii	Receiving	Mel de Lora	10 receptions, 143 yards

=== Utah State ===
	1	2	3	4	Total
Aggies	0	3	6	0	9
Cougars	6	0	0	0	6

Team	Category	Player	Statistics
Utah State	Passing	Tom Wilson	10/16, 106 yards
Utah State	Rushing	Louie Giammona	21 rushes, 59 yards
Utah State	Receiving	Jerry Cox	4 receptions, 44 yards
BYU	Passing	Gary Sheide	18/28, 170 yards, 4 INT
BYU	Rushing	Jeff Blanc	22 rushes, 104 yards
BYU	Receiving	Tom Toolson	5 receptions, 58 yards

=== At Iowa State ===
	1	2	3	4	Total
Cougars	0	0	0	7	7
Cyclones	5	10	7	12	34

Team	Category	Player	Statistics
BYU	Passing	Mark Giles	2/6, 31 yards, TD, 2 INT
BYU	Rushing	Mark Giles	6 rushes, 26 yards
BYU	Receiving	John Betham	2 receptions, 31 yards, TD
Iowa State	Passing	Wayne Stanley	4/16, 53 yards, 2 INT
Iowa State	Rushing	Steve Wilson	22 rushes, 107 yards
Iowa State	Receiving	Luther Blue	2 receptions, 26 yards

=== At Colorado State ===
	1	2	3	4	Total
Cougars	7	13	6	7	33
Rams	0	6	14	13	33

Team	Category	Player	Statistics
BYU	Passing	Gary Sheide	10/13, 123 yards, 3 TD
BYU	Rushing	Charley Ah You	13 rushes, 72 yards, TD
BYU	Receiving	Jeff Blanc	2 receptions, 43 yards
Colorado State	Passing	Jack Graham	22/46, 305 yards, 4 TD, 2 INT
Colorado State	Rushing	Jim McKenzie	11 rushes, 40 yards
Colorado State	Receiving	Willie Miller	6 receptions, 157 yards, TD

The game ended in controversy as Colorado State scored on the game's final play but the ensuing extra point from the 35-yard line, due to an unsportsmanlike conduct penalty, was missed although one official ruled that the attempt was good.

=== Wyoming ===
	1	2	3	4	Total
Cowboys	0	7	0	0	7
Cougars	3	14	7	14	38

Team	Category	Player	Statistics
Wyoming	Passing	Rick Costello	8/17, 85 yards, TD, 2 INT
Wyoming	Rushing	Charlie Shaw	7 rushes, 20 yards
Wyoming	Receiving	Archie Gray	3 receptions, 55 yards
BYU	Passing	Gary Sheide	20/27, 263 yards, 2 TD
BYU	Rushing	Jeff Blanc	24 rushes, 74 yards, 2 TD
BYU	Receiving	John Betham	4 receptions, 69 yards, 2 TD

=== UTEP ===
	1	2	3	4	Total
Miners	7	14	0	0	21
Cougars	21	14	7	3	45

Team	Category	Player	Statistics
UTEP	Passing	Bob McKinley	7/16, 121 yards, 2 TD
UTEP	Rushing	Bob McKinley	15 rushes, 103 yards, TD
UTEP	Receiving	Flash Collins	2 receptions, 67 yards, TD
BYU	Passing	Gary Sheide	27/40, 387 yards, 6 TD, INT
BYU	Rushing	Jeff Blanc	22 rushes, 90 yards, TD
BYU	Receiving	Jeff Nilsson	9 receptions, 176 yards, 3 TD

=== At No. 16 Arizona ===
	1	2	3	4	Total
Cougars	21	7	0	9	37
No. 16 Wildcats	7	0	6	0	13

Team	Category	Player	Statistics
BYU	Passing	Gary Sheide	20/35, 268 yards, 5 TD
BYU	Rushing	Charley Ah You	22 rushes, 69 yards
BYU	Receiving	John Betham	10 receptions, 144 yards, 3 TD
Arizona	Passing	Bruce Hill	9/29, 200 yards, 2 TD, 5 INT
Arizona	Rushing	Jim Upchurch	21 rushes, 108 yards
Arizona	Receiving	Willie Hamilton	2 receptions, 83 yards, TD

=== At Air Force ===
	1	2	3	4	Total
Cougars	6	0	6	0	12
Falcons	0	3	0	7	10

Team	Category	Player	Statistics
BYU	Passing	Gary Sheide	18/30, 215 yards, 2 TD, 2 INT
BYU	Rushing	Charley Ah You	30 rushes, 87 yards
BYU	Receiving	Sam LoBue	7 receptions, 109 yards
Air Force	Passing	Rob Shaw	16/28, 226 yards, TD, 2 INT
Air Force	Rushing	Ken Wood	15 rushes, 56 yards
Air Force	Receiving	Bob Farr	10 receptions, 117 yards, TD

=== No. 16 Arizona State ===
	1	2	3	4	Total
No. 16 Sun Devils	6	6	6	0	18
Cougars	2	6	6	7	21

Team	Category	Player	Statistics
Arizona State	Passing	Ray Alexander	8/20, 148 yards, TD, 3 INT
Arizona State	Rushing	Fred Williams	14 rushes, 48 yards
Arizona State	Receiving	John Washington	7 receptions, 110 yards
BYU	Passing	Gary Sheide	24/41, 224 yards, 2 TD, 5 INT
BYU	Rushing	Jeff Blanc	30 rushes, 77 yards, TD
BYU	Receiving	Jeff Blanc	6 receptions, 61 yards

=== At New Mexico ===
	1	2	3	4	Total
Cougars	7	13	6	10	36
Lobos	3	0	0	0	3

Team	Category	Player	Statistics
BYU	Passing	Gary Sheide	15/29, 244 yards, TD, 2 INT
BYU	Rushing	Jeff Blanc	24 rushes, 74 yards
BYU	Receiving	Jeff Blanc	3 receptions, 94 yards, TD
New Mexico	Passing	Ken Bryant	9/30, 66 yards, 2 INT
New Mexico	Rushing	Ken Bryant	20 rushes, 42 yards
New Mexico	Receiving	Preston Dennard	2 receptions, 20 yards

=== Utah ===
	1	2	3	4	Total
Utes	0	6	0	14	20
Cougars	14	7	14	13	48

Team	Category	Player	Statistics
Utah	Passing	Homer Warner	7/14, 103 yards, TD, INT
Utah	Rushing	Ike Spencer	6 rushes, 31 yards
Utah	Receiving	Mike Cordy	4 receptions, 60 yards
BYU	Passing	Gary Sheide	11/22, 104 yards, 2 TD, INT
BYU	Rushing	Jeff Blanc	20 rushes, 122 yards, 2 TD
BYU	Receiving	John Betham	2 receptions, 40 yards

=== Vs. Oklahoma State (Fiesta Bowl) ===
	1	2	3	4	Total
Cowboys	0	7	3	6	16
No. 17 Cougars	6	0	0	0	6

Team	Category	Player	Statistics
Oklahoma State	Passing	Charlie Weatherbie	6/16, 64 yards, TD
Oklahoma State	Rushing	Kenny Walker	6 rushes, 34 yards, TD
Oklahoma State	Receiving	Leonard Thompson	3 receptions, 42 yards, TD
BYU	Passing	Mark Giles	12/27, 138 yards, 3 INT
BYU	Rushing	Jeff Blanc	19 rushes, 53 yards
BYU	Receiving	Sam LoBue	3 receptions, 50 yards

== Roster ==
1974 BYU Cougars football team roster
Players
Coaches
Offense

Pos.	#	Name	Class
TE	87	Brian Billick	So
FB	33	Todd Christensen	Fr
OT	70	David Hubbard	So
QB	14	Gifford Nielsen	Fr
C	55	Orrin Olsen	Jr
OT	78	Brad Oates	Jr
QB	12	Gary Sheide	Sr
RB	35	Dan Van Valkenburg	So

Defense

Pos.	#	Name	Class
DT	72	Wayne Baker	Sr

Special teams

Pos.	#	Name	Class

Head coach

- LaVell Edwards

Coordinators/assistant coaches

Legend

- (C) Team captain
- (S) Suspended
- (I) Ineligible
- Injured
- Redshirt

Roster
