= 1975 Cleveland Browns season =

NFL team season

- Owner: Art Modell
- Head coach: Forrest Gregg
- Home stadium: Cleveland Municipal Stadium

Results
- Record: 3–11
- Division place: 4th AFC Central
- Playoffs: Did not qualify
- Pro Bowlers: DT Jerry Sherk

The 1975 Cleveland Browns season was the team's 26th season with the National Football League. The Browns lost their first nine games—again, a team record—en route to going 3–11 in Forrest Gregg's first year as head coach after having been promoted from offensive line coach following the offseason firing of Nick Skorich.

Other than a 16–15 decision at Denver in Week 5 and a 24–17 decision at Cincinnati in the season opener, the losses had wide scoring margins. At home, the Browns fell 42–10 to the Minnesota Vikings, 42–6 to the Pittsburgh Steelers, and 40–10 to the Houston Oilers, their worst three-game stretch. Later in the year—it was the last of those nine consecutive defeats—the Browns were beaten 38–17 at Oakland.

The Steelers and Vikings both finished 12–2, the Oilers just missed the playoffs at 10–4 and the 11–3 Raiders lost to Pittsburgh in the AFC Championship Game, but none of that was of any consolation to a franchise as proud as the Browns. After 1974, the Browns were hoping that 1975, for which the team went to orange pants and altered its basic uniform design for the first time since that inaugural season of 1946, would usher in a new era of success. But it did not work out that way. The problem for the Browns was that they were in the middle of a major rebuilding phase, trying to replace old-line, grizzled veterans from the team's glory days of the 1960s with free agents from other teams, or young players. Another problem was at the QB position; Mike Phipps, the Browns' No. 3 overall pick in the 1970 NFL Draft, threw just four touchdown passes with 19 INTs on the year. More and more, Browns fans were calling for Brian Sipe, who started in two victories in the final five games in 1974, to permanently secure the starting quarterback job in what became a major quarterback controversy.

Asides from the progress of Sipe, another diamond in the rough was Greg Pruitt. With Pro Football Hall of Famer Leroy Kelly having retired after the 1973 season, Pruitt, the first of the team's two second-round draft picks that year, had taken a quantum leap in 1975 into settling into his job as the go-to running back. He raced for 214 yards, still the seventh-best performance in team history, en-route to putting together the first of his three-straight 1,000-yard seasons by getting 1,067. He became the first 1,000-yard runner for the team since Kelly in 1968.

Pruitt averaged 4.8 yards per carry in 1975, the highest by a Brown since Kelly's 5.0 in 1968, and, while scoring three times against the Chiefs, rushed for eight touchdowns, the most since Kelly's 10 in 1971.

== Offseason ==
=== NFL draft ===
The following were selected in the 1975 NFL draft.

1975 Cleveland Browns draft
Round	Pick	Player	Position	College	Notes
1	5	Mack Mitchell	Defensive end	Houston	
3	57	Oscar Roan	Tight end	SMU	
4	82	Tony Peters *	Defensive back	Oklahoma	
5	109	John Zimba	Defensive end	Villanova	
5	119	Jim Cope	Linebacker	Ohio State	
6	150	Charles Miller	Defensive back	West Virginia	Signed with Edmonton Eskimos (CFL)
6	154	Henry Hynoski	Running back	Temple	
7	161	Merle Wang	Tackle	TCU	
8	186	Barry Santini	Tight end	Purdue	
9	213	Larry Poole	Running back	Kent State	
9	215	Floyd Hogan	Defensive back	Arkansas	
10	238	Stan Lewis	Defensive end	Wayne State (NE)	
11	265	Tom Marinelli	Guard	Boston College	
12	290	Dick Ambrose	Linebacker	Virginia	
13	317	Willie Armstead	Wide receiver	Utah	Signed with Calgary Stampeders (CFL)
14	341	Tim Barrett	Running back	John Carroll	
15	369	Willie Moore	Defensive tackle	Johnson C. Smith	
16	394	John McKay	Wide receiver	USC	Signed with Southern California Sun (WFL)
17	421	Dave Graf	Linebacker	Penn State	
Made roster * Made at least one Pro Bowl during career

== Personnel ==
=== Staff / Coaches ===
1975 Cleveland Browns staff
Front office: Owner and president – Art Modell; Executive vice president/general manager – Harold Sauerbrai; Head coaches: Head coaches – Forrest Gregg; Offensive coaches: Quarterbacks – Blanton Collier; Running backs – George Sefcik; Wide receivers – Doug Gerhart; Offensive line – Rod Humenuik	Defensive coaches: Defensive Coordinator – Dick Modzelewski; Linebackers – Walt Corey; Secondary / defensive backs – Richie McCabe; Special teams coaches: Special teams – Al Tabor; Film Coordinator – Ed Ulinski; Athletic Trainer – Leo Murphy

=== Roster ===
1975 Cleveland Browns roster
Quarterbacks: 15 Mike Phipps; 16 Will Cureton; 17 Brian Sipe; Running backs: 30 Ken Brown; 34 Greg Pruitt; 36 Henry Hynoski; 37 Hugh McKinnis; 39 Billy Pritchett; Wide receivers: 26 Billy Lefear; 33 Reggie Rucker; 80 Willie Miller; 88 Steve Holden; Tight ends: 81 Oscar Roan; 84 Gary Parris; 89 Milt Morin	Offensive linemen: 54 Tom DeLeone C; 63 Barry Darrow T; 65 John Demarie C/G; 67 Chuck Hutchison G; 68 Robert Jackson G; 73 Doug Dieken T; 78 Bob McKay T; 79 Gerry Sullivan T; Defensive linemen: 64 Joe Jones DE; 70 Mack Mitchell DE; 71 Walter Johnson DT; 72 Jerry Sherk DT; 74 Carl Barisich DT; 77 Ron East DE	Linebackers: 50 John Garlington OLB; 52 Dick Ambrose MLB; 55 Dave Graf OLB; 56 Jack LeVeck MLB; 59 Charlie Hall OLB; 60 Bob Babich OLB/MLB; Defensive backs: 20 Tony Peters CB; 21 Van Green SS; 22 Clarence Scott CB; 40 Joe Beauchamp CB/S; 42 Neal Craig FS; 48 John Pitts SS; 49 Jim Hill FS; Special teams: 12 Don Cockroft K/P	Reserve lists: 69 Pete Adams T (IR); -- Billy Corbett T (IR); 27 Thom Darden FS (IR); 31 Cleo Miller RB (IR); 38 Larry Poole RB (IR); rookies in italics

== Exhibition schedule ==
Week	Date	Opponent	Result	Attendance
1	August 10	at San Francisco 49ers	L 13–17	45,560
2	August 16	Philadelphia Eagles	W 14–6	35,769
3	August 22	at Washington Redskins	L 14–23	15,513
4	September 1	Buffalo Bills	L 20–34	31,155
5	September 7	vs. New York Giants at Seattle	W 24–20	20,000
6	September 13	Detroit Lions	L 24–27	32,341

== Schedule ==
Week	Date	Opponent	Result	Record	Venue	Attendance	Recap
1	September 21	at **Cincinnati Bengals**	**L** 17–24	0–1	Riverfront Stadium	52,874	Recap
2	September 28	Minnesota Vikings	**L** 10–42	0–2	Cleveland Municipal Stadium	68,064	Recap
3	October 5	**Pittsburgh Steelers**	**L** 6–42	0–3	Cleveland Municipal Stadium	73,595	Recap
4	October 12	**Houston Oilers**	**L** 10–40	0–4	Cleveland Municipal Stadium	46,531	Recap
5	October 19	at Denver Broncos	**L** 15–16	0–5	Mile High Stadium	52,590	Recap
6	October 26	Washington Redskins	**L** 7–23	0–6	Cleveland Municipal Stadium	56,702	Recap
7	November 2	at Baltimore Colts	**L** 7–21	0–7	Municipal Stadium	35,235	Recap
8	November 9	at Detroit Lions	**L** 10–21	0–8	Pontiac Metropolitan Stadium	75,283	Recap
9	November 16	at Oakland Raiders	**L** 17–38	0–9	Oakland–Alameda County Coliseum	50,461	Recap
10	November 23	**Cincinnati Bengals**	**W** 35–23	1–9	Cleveland Municipal Stadium	56,427	Recap
11	November 30	New Orleans Saints	**W** 17–16	2–9	Cleveland Municipal Stadium	44,753	Recap
12	December 7	at **Pittsburgh Steelers**	**L** 17–31	2–10	Three Rivers Stadium	47,962	Recap
13	December 14	Kansas City Chiefs	**W** 40–14	3–10	Cleveland Municipal Stadium	44,368	Recap
14	December 21	at **Houston Oilers**	**L** 10–21	3–11	Houston Astrodome	43,770	Recap
Note: Intra-division opponents are in **bold** text.

=== Standings ===
AFC Central
	W	L	T	PCT	DIV	CONF	PF	PA	STK
Pittsburgh Steelers^{(1)}	12	2	0	.857	6–0	10–1	373	162	L1
Cincinnati Bengals^{(4)}	11	3	0	.786	3–3	8–3	340	246	W1
Houston Oilers	10	4	0	.714	2–4	7–4	293	226	W3
Cleveland Browns	3	11	0	.214	1–5	2–8	218	372	L1

== Milestones ==
- Greg Pruitt, 304 Combined Net Yards vs. the Cincinnati Bengals, November 23,
