= Larry Jameson =

American football player (born 1953)

No. 69
- Position: Defensive tackle

Personal information
- Born: February 1, 1953 (age 73); Washington, D.C., U.S.
- Listed height: 6 ft 7 in (2.01 m)
- Listed weight: 270 lb (122 kg)

Career information
- College: Indiana
- NFL draft: 1975: 6th round, 152nd overall pick

Career history
- Tampa Bay Buccaneers (1976)
- Stats at Pro Football Reference

George Larry Jameson (born February 1, 1953) is a former National Football League (NFL) defensive tackle who played for the Tampa Bay Buccaneers in 1976. He attended Rantoul High School and then Indiana University before being taken in the 6th round, 152nd overall, by the St. Louis Cardinals in the 1975 NFL draft.
