= Bill Mondt =

American football coach (1934–2023)

Biographical details
- Born: December 16, 1934; Weld County, Colorado, U.S.

Playing career
- 1956–1958: Colorado
- Positions: Linebacker, offensive guard

Coaching career (HC unless noted)
- 1959–1960: Washington HS (KS) (assistant)
- 1961–1963: Air Academy HS (CO)
- 1964–1966: Colorado (assistant)
- 1968–1973: New Mexico (assistant)
- 1974–1979: New Mexico
- 1994–2013: Eaton HS (CO)

Head coaching record
- Overall: 32–36–1 (college)

William Edward Mondt (December 16, 1934) was an American football player and coach. He played college football as a linebacker and offensive guard for the Colorado Buffaloes from 1956 to 1958 and was the head coach of the New Mexico Lobos from 1974 to 1979. He was also an assistant football coach at Colorado (1964–1966) and New Mexico (1968–1973) and the head football coach at Colorado's Air Academy High School (1961–1963) and Eaton High School (1994–2013)

== Early years ==
A native of Hardin, Weld County, Colorado, Mondt was the valedictorian at Kersey High School and also starred in football, baseball, and basketball. He enrolled at the University of Colorado in the fall of 1954 on an academic scholarship. He played football as a linebacker and offensive guard for the Colorado Buffaloes football teams from 1956 to 1958. He was a member of the 1956 Colorado Buffaloes football team that defeated Clemson in the 1957 Orange Bowl. He graduated from Colorado in 1959 with a degree in mechanical engineering.

== Coaching career ==
=== High school coach ===
Mondt began his coaching career as an assistant football coach at Washington High School in Kansas City, Kansas, in 1959 and 1960. He also taught geometry, algebra, and functional math. He next worked as the head football coach at Colorado's Air Academy High School from 1961 to 1963.

=== Colorado ===
In March 1964, he was hired as an assistant football coach at his alma mater, the University of Colorado. He left coaching in 1967 and worked as an engineer for Samsonite Co.

=== New Mexico ===
In December 1967, Mondt was hired as an assistant coach at the University of New Mexico. He remained an assistant coach at New Mexico for six years until December 1973 when he was hired as New Mexico's head football coach after Feldman was fired. He served as the Lobos' head coach from 1974 to 1979, compiling a record of 32–36–1 (18–23 against WAC opponents). He was fired in November 1979.

=== Eaton High School ===
After being fired by the University of New Mexico, Mondt worked for Galles Racing for four years and then partnered with a former Colorado teammate to found Stolar Research. In 1994, Mondt sold his interest in Stolar and moved to Eaton, Colorado. For the next 20 years, he was the head football coach and a math and physics teacher at Eaton High School. He retired in 2014. In 20 years as the head coach at Eaton, he compiled a 160–60 record.

== Personal life ==
Mondt married Jo Ann Wagner of Greeley, Colorado, in June 1959. They had two daughters, Tracey Jo (born March 1960) and Terri Ann (born 1962).

== Head coaching record ==
=== College ===
Year	Team	Overall	Conference	Standing	Bowl/playoffs
New Mexico Lobos (Western Athletic Conference) (1974–1979)
1974	New Mexico	4–6–1	3–4	T–4th	
1975	New Mexico	6–5	4–3	T–4th	
1976	New Mexico	4–7	3–4	T–5th	
1977	New Mexico	5–7	2–5	T–6th	
1978	New Mexico	7–5	3–3	4th	
1979	New Mexico	5–7	3–4	T–5th	
New Mexico:		31–37–1	18–23		
Total:		31–37–1			
