= 1974 San Jose State Spartans football team =

American college football season

1974 San Jose State Spartans football
- Conference: Pacific Coast Athletic Association
- Record: 8–3–1 (2–0–2 PCAA)
- Head coach: Darryl Rogers (2nd season)
- Defensive coordinator: Bob Padilla (2nd season)
- Home stadium: Spartan Stadium

1974 Pacific Coast Athletic Association football standings
	Conf.					Overall
Team	W		L		T	W		L		T
San Diego State $	4	–	0	–	0	8	–	2	–	1
San Jose State	2	–	2	–	0	8	–	3	–	1
Pacific (CA)	2	–	2	–	0	6	–	5	–	0
Long Beach State	1	–	3	–	0	6	–	5	–	0
Fresno State	1	–	3	–	0	5	–	7	–	0
Cal State Fullerton	0	–	0	–	0	4	–	6	–	0
$ – Conference champion

The 1974 San Jose State Spartans football team represented San Jose State University during the 1974 NCAA Division I football season as a member of the Pacific Coast Athletic Association. (Note: The Big West Conference was known as the Pacific Coast Athletic Association from its founding in 1969 through 1987.) The team was led by second year head coach Darryl Rogers. They played home games at Spartan Stadium in San Jose, California. The Spartans finished the season with a record of eight wins, three losses and one tie (8–3–1, 2–2–0 PCAA).

Quarterback Craig Kimball led all major-college players in pass attempts (355) and passing touchdowns (23), ranked second in passing yards (2,401) and interceptions (19), third in total yards (2,338) and yards gained per game (200.1), and fourth in pass completions (175).

== Schedule ==
Date	Opponent	Site	Result	Attendance	Source
September 7	Santa Clara*	Spartan Stadium; San Jose, CA	W 47–10	18,250	
September 14	Fresno State	Spartan Stadium; San Jose, CA (rivalry)	W 28–7	16,155	
September 21	at No. 6 California*	California Memorial Stadium; Berkeley, CA	L 16–17	25,000	
September 28	at Stanford*	Stanford Stadium; Stanford, California (rivalry)	T 21–21	45,000	
October 5	Long Beach State^{†}	Spartan Stadium; San Jose, CA	W 27–17	17,250	
October 12	at New Mexico*	University Stadium; Albuquerque, NM	W 13–11	15,974	
October 19	at San Diego State	San Diego Stadium; San Diego, CA	L 14–40	33,714	
October 26	at Pacific (CA)	Pacific Memorial Stadium; Stockton, CA (Victory Bell)	L 27–29	16,306	
November 2	at Utah*	Robert Rice Stadium; Salt Lake City, UT	W 24–6	14,327	
November 9	at Hawaii*	Honolulu Stadium; Honolulu, HI (rivalry)	W 32–11	13,629	
November 16	at Cal State Fullerton*	Santa Ana Stadium; Santa Ana, CA	W 49–8	2,148	
November 22	at Southwestern Louisiana*	Cajun Field; Lafayette, LA	W 25–22	8,653	
*Non-conference game; ^{†}Homecoming; Rankings from Coaches' Poll released prior to the game

== Team players in the NFL ==
The following were selected in the 1975 NFL draft.

Player	Position	Round	Overall	NFL team
Louis Wright	Defensive back	1	17	Denver Broncos
Dave Wasick	Linebacker	6	139	Kansas City Chiefs
Ike McBee	Wide receiver	11	284	San Diego Chargers
Art Kuehn	Center	15	384	Washington Redskins
