= Harry Knight (Canadian football) =

American gridiron football player (born 1953)

No. 6
- Position: Quarterback

Personal information
- Born: September 9, 1953 (age 73); Newport News, Virginia, U.S.
- Listed height: 6 ft 3 in (1.91 m)
- Listed weight: 205 lb (93 kg)

Career information
- College: Richmond
- NFL draft: 1975: 9th round, 232nd overall pick

Career history
- 1975: Oakland Raiders*
- 1975–1978: Winnipeg Blue Bombers
- * Offseason or practice squad member only

Harry Garland Knight (born September 9, 1953) is an American former professional football quarterback who played four seasons with the Winnipeg Blue Bombers of the Canadian Football League (CFL). He was selected by the Oakland Raiders of the National Football League (NFL) in the ninth round of the 1975 NFL draft after playing college football at the University of Richmond.

== Early life and college ==
Harry Garland Knight was born on September 9, 1953, in Newport News, Virginia. He was a member of the Richmond Spiders football team of the University of Richmond from 1971 to 1974. He completed 57 of 138 passes (41.3%) for 703 yards, five touchdowns, and four interceptions in 1972. The next year, he recorded 76 pass completions on 166 attempts (45.8%) for 1,185 yards, ten touchdowns, and four interceptions while also scoring two rushing touchdowns. Knight completed 120 of 247 passes (48.6%) for 1,577 yards, ten touchdowns, and 12 interceptions his senior season in 1974, and also scored a rushing touchdown. His completions, attempts, completion percentage, passing yards, and passing touchdowns all led the Southern Conference that year. Knight majored in physical education at Richmond.

== Professional career ==
Knight was selected by the Oakland Raiders in the ninth round, with the 232nd overall pick, of the 1975 NFL draft. He was released later in 1975.

Knight then played in three games for the Winnipeg Blue Bombers of the Canadian Football League (CFL) in 1975 but did not record any statistics. He played in all 16 games in 1976, completing 15 of 28 passes (53.6%) for 191 yards, one touchdown, and two interceptions. Knight played in all 16 games for the second consecutive season in 1977, totaling 41 completions on 80 passing attempts (51.3%) for 489 yards, one touchdown, and five interceptions. He appeared in five games during his final season in 1978, completing 16 of 30 passes (53.3%) for 227 yards and a touchdown.
