= 1974 Pacific Tigers football team =

American college football season

1974 Pacific Tigers football
- Conference: Pacific Coast Athletic Association
- Record: 6–5 (2–2 PCAA)
- Head coach: Chester Caddas (3rd season)
- Home stadium: Pacific Memorial Stadium

1974 Pacific Coast Athletic Association football standings
	Conf.					Overall
Team	W		L		T	W		L		T
San Diego State $	4	–	0	–	0	8	–	2	–	1
San Jose State	2	–	2	–	0	8	–	3	–	1
Pacific (CA)	2	–	2	–	0	6	–	5	–	0
Long Beach State	1	–	3	–	0	6	–	5	–	0
Fresno State	1	–	3	–	0	5	–	7	–	0
Cal State Fullerton	0	–	0	–	0	4	–	6	–	0
$ – Conference champion

The 1974 Pacific Tigers football team represented the University of the Pacific (UOP) in the 1974 NCAA Division I football season as a member of the Pacific Coast Athletic Association. (Note: The Big West Conference was known as the Pacific Coast Athletic Association from its founding in 1969 through 1987.)

The team was led by head coach Chester Caddas, in his third year, and played their home games at Pacific Memorial Stadium (Note: Amos Alonzo Stagg Memorial Stadium was known as Pacific Memorial Stadium from its opening in 1950 through 1987.) in Stockton, California. They finished the season with a record of six wins and five losses (6–5, 2–2 PCAA).

== Schedule ==
Date	Opponent	Site	Result	Attendance	Source
September 7	Sacramento State*	Pacific Memorial Stadium; Stockton, CA	W 21–0	13,000	
September 14	at UTEP*	Sun Bowl; El Paso, TX	W 17–14	15,464	
September 21	Long Beach State	Pacific Memorial Stadium; Stockton, CA	W 38–6	13,595	
September 28	at Kansas State*	KSU Stadium; Manhattan, KS	L 7–38	24,100	
October 5	Hawaii*	Pacific Memorial Stadium; Stockton, CA	L 14–23	11,842	
October 11	at Miami (FL)*	Miami Orange Bowl; Miami, FL	L 6–35	15,184	
October 19	at Fresno State	Ratcliffe Stadium; Fresno, CA	L 21–37	8,277	
October 26	San Jose State^{†}	Pacific Memorial Stadium; Stockton, CA (Victory Bell)	W 29–27	16,306	
November 2	UT Arlington*	Pacific Memorial Stadium; Stockton, CA	W 26–17	8,500	
November 9	at San Diego State	San Diego Stadium; San Diego, CA	L 9–37	27,049	
November 16	at Wyoming*	War Memorial Stadium; Laramie, WY	W 50–14	9,672	
*Non-conference game; ^{†}Homecoming

== Team players in the NFL ==
The following UOP players were selected in the 1975 NFL draft.

Player	Position	Round	Overall	NFL team
Willard Harrell	Running back	3	58	Green Bay Packers
Carlos Brown (aka Alan Autry)	Quarterback	12	296	Green Bay Packers
