= Harvey Goodman (American football) =

American football player (born 1952)

No. 64
- Position: Offensive guard

Personal information
- Born: September 16, 1952 (age 74); Los Angeles, California, U.S.
- Listed height: 6 ft 4 in (1.93 m)
- Listed weight: 260 lb (118 kg)

Career information
- High school: Hollywood (Los Angeles)
- College: Los Angeles City (1971); Colorado (1972–1974)
- NFL draft: 1975: 5th round, 124th overall pick

Career history
- St. Louis Cardinals (1975)*; Southern California Sun (1975); Denver Broncos (1976); Philadelphia Eagles (1978)*; San Diego Chargers (1978)*; Denver Gold (1983)*
- * Offseason or practice squad member only
- Stats at Pro Football Reference

Harvey Franklin Goodman (born September 16, 1952) is an American former professional football offensive guard who played one season with the Denver Broncos of the National Football League (NFL). He played college football at Colorado and was selected by the St. Louis Cardinals in the fifth round of the 1975 NFL draft.

== Early life and college ==
Harvey Franklin Goodman was born on September 16, 1952, in Los Angeles, California. He attended Hollywood High School in Los Angeles.

Goodman first played college football at Los Angeles City College in 1971. He then transferred to the University of Colorado Boulder, where he was a three-year letterman for the Colorado Buffaloes from 1972 to 1974.

== Professional career ==
Goodman was selected by the St. Louis Cardinals in the fifth round, with the 124th overall pick, of the 1975 NFL draft. He was released by the Cardinals on September 3, 1975.

Goodman signed with the Southern California Sun of the World Football League on September 11, 1975. He played in one game for the Sun before being released on September 16, 1975.

Goodman was signed by the Denver Broncos in 1976. He played in all 14 games for the Broncos during the 1976 season. He was released on September 14, 1977.

Goodman signed with the Philadelphia Eagles in 1978. On July 27, 1978, he was traded to the San Diego Chargers for future considerations. Eagles head coach Dick Vermeil stated "The Chargers were down to two tackles and we decided to help them out with a lineman. We don't think Harvey would have stuck, anyway." Goodman was released by the Chargers on August 28, 1978.

Years later, Goodman signed with the Denver Gold of the United States Football League (USFL) for the 1983 season. However, he was released on February 1, 1983.

== Personal life ==
His brother Brian also played in the NFL.
