= Wayne Baker (American football) =

American football player (born 1953)

No. 78
- Position: Defensive tackle

Personal information
- Born: July 7, 1953 (age 73); Sandpoint, Idaho, U.S.
- Listed height: 6 ft 6 in (1.98 m)
- Listed weight: 270 lb (122 kg)

Career information
- High school: Plains, Montana
- College: BYU
- NFL draft: 1975: 3rd round, 74th overall pick

Career history
- San Francisco 49ers (1975)

Awards and highlights
- Second-team All-American (1974)
- Stats at Pro Football Reference

Wayne Mitchell Baker (born July 7, 1953) is an American former professional football player who was a defensive tackle for the San Francisco 49ers of the National Football League (NFL). He played college football for the BYU Cougars.
