= Ken Brown (offensive lineman) =

American football player (born 1954)

No. 55, 74
- Position: Center

Personal information
- Born: April 19, 1954 (age 72); Saginaw, Michigan, U.S.
- Listed height: 6 ft 1 in (1.85 m)
- Listed weight: 245 lb (111 kg)

Career information
- High school: Ganesha
- College: New Mexico
- NFL draft: 1976: undrafted

Career history
- New Orleans Saints (1976)*; Denver Broncos (1977–1979); Green Bay Packers (1980)
- * Offseason or practice squad member only
- Stats at Pro Football Reference

Kenneth Eugene Brown (born April 19, 1954) is a former center in the National Football League.

== Biography ==
Brown was born in Saginaw, Michigan on April 19, 1954. He now lives in Colorado.

== Career ==
Brown played with the Denver Broncos during the 1979 NFL season. The following season, he was a member of the Green Bay Packers.

He played at the collegiate level at the University of New Mexico.
