= 1974 Arizona State Sun Devils football team =

American college football season

1974 Arizona State Sun Devils football
- Conference: Western Athletic Conference
- Record: 7–5 (4–3 WAC)
- Head coach: Frank Kush (17th season)
- Defensive coordinator: Larry Kentera (4th season)
- Home stadium: Sun Devil Stadium

1974 Western Athletic Conference football standings
	Conf.					Overall
Team	W		L		T	W		L		T
BYU $	6	–	0	–	1	7	–	4	–	1
Arizona	6	–	1	–	0	9	–	2	–	0
Arizona State	4	–	3	–	0	7	–	5	–	0
New Mexico	3	–	4	–	0	4	–	6	–	1
UTEP	3	–	4	–	0	4	–	7	–	0
Colorado State	2	–	3	–	1	4	–	6	–	1
Utah	1	–	5	–	0	1	–	10	–	0
Wyoming	1	–	6	–	0	2	–	9	–	0
$ – Conference champion

The 1974 Arizona State Sun Devils football team represented Arizona State University in the 1974 NCAA Division I football season. The offense scored 267 points while the defense allowed 163 points. Led by head coach Frank Kush, the Sun Devils finished with a 7–5 record.

== Schedule ==
Date	Opponent	Rank	Site	Result	Attendance	Source
September 7	No. 11 Houston*	No. 15	Sun Devil Stadium; Tempe, AZ	W 30–9	50,227	
September 21	TCU*	No. 11	Sun Devil Stadium; Tempe, AZ	W 37–7	50,811	
September 28	at Missouri*	No. 7	Faurot Field; Columbia, MO	L 0–9	59,770	
October 5	at Wyoming	No. 18	War Memorial Stadium; Laramie, WY	W 16–10	18,675	
October 19	Utah	No. 15	Sun Devil Stadium; Tempe, AZ	W 32–0	48,260	
October 26	New Mexico	No. 14	Sun Devil Stadium; Tempe, AZ	W 41–7	45,487	
November 2	UTEP	No. 14	Sun Devil Stadium; Tempe, AZ	L 27–31	46,500	
November 9	at BYU	No. 16	Cougar Stadium; Provo, UT	L 18–21	26,922	
November 16	No. 16 NC State*		Sun Devil Stadium; Tempe, AZ	L 14–35	50,000	
November 23	Colorado State		Sun Devil Stadium; Tempe, AZ	W 26–21	45,235	
November 30	at Arizona		Arizona Stadium; Tucson, AZ (Territorial Cup)	L 0–10	40,872	
December 7	at Hawaii*		Honolulu Stadium; Honolulu, HI	W 26–3	23,000	
*Non-conference game; Rankings from AP Poll released prior to the game

== Personnel ==
1974 Arizona State Sun Devils football team roster
Players
Coaches
Offense

Pos.	#	Name	Class
OL		Scott Alden
QB		Ray Alexander
TE		Paul Ervin
OL		Jim Helig
TE		Charley Hobbs
OL		John Houser
WR		Greg Hudson
WR		John Jefferson
FB		Mark Lovett	So
RB		Larry Mucker
OL		Dave Orzell
RB		Morris Owens
RB		Stan Robinson
QB		Dennis Sproul	Fr
OL		Rick Torbert
RB		Freddie Williams
OL		Billy Joe Winchester

Defense

Pos.	#	Name	Class
DL		Clifton Alapa
LB		Bob Breunig
LB		Larry Gordon
CB		Mike Haynes
DL		Chris Lorenzen
DB		Mike Martinez
DL		Rocky Mataalii
DL		Randy Moore
DB		Cory Schuknecht
DL		Tom Seiper
DB		Alex Stencel
DL		Ed Vaughn
DL		Al Weigandt

Special teams

Pos.	#	Name	Class

Head coach

- Frank Kush

Coordinators/assistant coaches

Legend

- (C) Team captain
- (S) Suspended
- (I) Ineligible
- Injured
- Redshirt

== 1975 NFL draft ==
The following players were claimed in the 1975 NFL draft.

Player	Position	Round	Pick	NFL club
Bob Breunig	Linebacker	3	70	Dallas Cowboys
Morris Owens	Wide receiver	5	106	Miami Dolphins
