= 1974 Colorado State Rams football team =

American college football season

1974 Colorado State Rams football
- Conference: Western Athletic Conference
- Record: 4–6–1 (2–3–1 WAC)
- Head coach: Sark Arslanian (2nd season)
- Offensive coordinator: Doug Gerhart (2nd season)
- Defensive coordinator: Charles Armey (2nd season)
- Home stadium: Hughes Stadium

1974 Western Athletic Conference football standings
	Conf.					Overall
Team	W		L		T	W		L		T
BYU $	6	–	0	–	1	7	–	4	–	1
Arizona	6	–	1	–	0	9	–	2	–	0
Arizona State	4	–	3	–	0	7	–	5	–	0
New Mexico	3	–	4	–	0	4	–	6	–	1
UTEP	3	–	4	–	0	4	–	7	–	0
Colorado State	2	–	3	–	1	4	–	6	–	1
Utah	1	–	5	–	0	1	–	10	–	0
Wyoming	1	–	6	–	0	2	–	9	–	0
$ – Conference champion

The 1974 Colorado State Rams football team represented Colorado State University in the Western Athletic Conference during the 1974 NCAA Division I football season. In their second season under head coach Sark Arslanian, the Rams compiled a 4–6–1 record.

== Schedule ==
Date	Opponent	Site	Result	Attendance	Source
September 14	at New Mexico	University Stadium; Albuquerque, NM	L 23–32	16,308	
September 21	at Florida State*	Doak Campbell Stadium; Tallahassee, FL	W 14–7	30,984	
September 28	Memphis State*	Hughes Stadium; Fort Collins, CO	L 18–20	23,984	
October 5	BYU	Hughes Stadium; Fort Collins, CO	T 33–33	17,458	
October 12	at Utah State*	Romney Stadium; Logan, UT	L 23–24	9,008	
October 19	Nevada*^{†}	Hughes Stadium; Fort Collins, CO	W 66–17	24,472	
October 26	at Arkansas*	War Memorial Stadium; Little Rock, AR	L 9–43	44,852	
November 2	Wyoming	Hughes Stadium; Fort Collins, CO (rivalry)	W 11–6	19,555	
November 9	at Arizona	Arizona Stadium; Tucson, AZ	L 21–34	33,116	
November 26	UTEP	Hughes Stadium; Fort Collins, CO	W 56–24	16,883	
December 4	at Arizona State	Sun Devil Stadium; Tempe, AZ	L 21–26	45,235	
*Non-conference game; ^{†}Homecoming
