= Brian Goodman (American football) =

American football player (born 1949)

No. 68
- Position: Offensive guard

Personal information
- Born: December 7, 1949 (age 76); Los Angeles, California, U.S.
- Listed height: 6 ft 2 in (1.88 m)
- Listed weight: 250 lb (113 kg)

Career information
- High school: Hollywood (Los Angeles, California)
- College: Los Angeles Valley (1968–1969); UCLA (1970–1971)
- NFL draft: 1972: undrafted

Career history
- Dallas Cowboys (1972)*; Los Angeles Rams (1973)*; Detroit Lions (1973)*; Houston Oilers (1973–1974); Denver Broncos (1975); San Francisco 49ers (1976)*
- * Offseason or practice squad member only
- Stats at Pro Football Reference

Brian Harbert Goodman (born December 7, 1949) is an American former professional football offensive guard who played two seasons with the Houston Oilers of the National Football League (NFL). He played college football at Los Angeles Valley College and the University of California, Los Angeles. He was also a member of the Dallas Cowboys, Los Angeles Rams, Detroit Lions, Denver Broncos and San Francisco 49ers.

== Early life and college ==
Brian Harbert Goodman was born on December 7, 1949, in Los Angeles, California. He attended Hollywood High School in Los Angeles.

He first played college football at Los Angeles Valley College from 1968 to 1969. He was then a two-year letterman for the UCLA Bruins of the University of California, Los Angeles from 1970 to 1971.

== Professional career ==
After going undrafted in the 1972 NFL draft, Goodman signed with the Dallas Cowboys on February 7. He was placed on the team's taxi squad on September 7 but was soon released on September 11, 1972.

He signed with the Los Angeles Rams on May 9, 1973, but was later reported as having left training camp on July 18, 1973.

On July 21, 1973, Goodman was traded to the Detroit Lions for a 1974 ninth-round draft pick. He was released on August 29, 1973.

He then signed with the Houston Oilers in 1973 and played in three games, starting two, for the team during the 1973 season. He started all 14 games for the Oilers in 1974. The team finished the season with a 7–7 record. Goodman was released on September 9, 1975.

Goodman was signed by the Denver Broncos in 1975 but did not appear in any games for them.

On June 30, 1976, Goodman and Bob Adams were traded to the San Francisco 49ers for Fair Hooker and an undisclosed draft pick. Goodman was released by the 49ers in 1976.

== Personal life ==
Goodman graduated from Southwestern Baptist Theological Seminary in 1991 and became a pastor. His brother Harvey also played in the NFL.
