= Stan Rogers (American football) =

American football player (born 1952)

No. 73
- Position: Offensive tackle

Personal information
- Born: March 10, 1952 (age 74); Peckville, Pennsylvania, U.S.
- Listed height: 6 ft 4 in (1.93 m)
- Listed weight: 256 lb (116 kg)

Career information
- High school: Saint Pius X
- College: Maryland
- NFL draft: 1975: 5th round, 107th overall pick

Career history
- Denver Broncos (1975); New York Jets (1976)*
- * Offseason or practice squad member only

Awards and highlights
- First-team All-ACC (1974)
- Stats at Pro Football Reference

Stanley Gerald Rogers (born March 10, 1952) is an American former professional football offensive tackle who played for the Denver Broncos of the National Football League (NFL). He played college football for the Maryland Terrapins and was selected by the Broncos in the fifth round of the 1975 NFL draft.

== Early life ==
Stanley Gerald Rogers was born on March 10, 1952, in Peckville, Pennsylvania. He attended Saint Pius X High School in Lower Pottsgrove Township, Pennsylvania.

== College career ==
Rogers enrolled at the University of Maryland to play college football for the Terrapins. He was a three-year letterman from 1972 to 1974. He earned first-team All-Atlantic Coast Conference honors as a senior in 1974.

== Professional career ==
Rogers was selected by the Denver Broncos in the fifth round, with the 107th overall pick, of the 1975 NFL draft. He signed with the team on March 28. He played in all 14 games, starting two, for the Broncos during the 1975 season. He was waived on September 6, 1976, after the final preseason game.

Rogers was claimed off waivers by the New York Jets on September 8, 1976, but waived the next day.

== Personal life ==
After his NFL career, Rogers became a corrections officer at Graterford Prison, including ten years working on death row.
