= Mike Franckowiak =

American football player (born 1953)

No. 31, 36, 84
- Position: Running back

Personal information
- Born: March 25, 1953 (age 73); Grand Rapids, Michigan, U.S.
- Listed height: 6 ft 3 in (1.91 m)
- Listed weight: 220 lb (100 kg)

Career information
- High school: West Catholic (Grand Rapids)
- College: Central Michigan
- NFL draft: 1975: 3rd round, 54th overall pick

Career history
- Denver Broncos (1975–1976); Buffalo Bills (1977–1978)

Awards and highlights
- NCAA Division II national champion (1974)

Career NFL statistics
- Rushing yards: 26
- Rushing average: 1.9
- Receptions: 4
- Receiving yards: 42
- Stats at Pro Football Reference

Mike Franckowiak (born March 25, 1953) is an American former professional football player who was a running back in the National Football League (NFL). He played for the Denver Broncos from 1975 to 1976 and for the Buffalo Bills from 1977 to 1978.

He played quarterback at Central Michigan.
