= 1974 Arizona Wildcats football team =

American college football season

1974 Arizona Wildcats football
- Conference: Western Athletic Conference
- Record: 9–2 (6–1 WAC)
- Head coach: Jim Young (2nd season)
- Offensive coordinator: John Mackovic (2nd season)
- Defensive coordinator: Larry Smith (2nd season)
- Home stadium: Arizona Stadium

1974 Western Athletic Conference football standings
	Conf.					Overall
Team	W		L		T	W		L		T
BYU $	6	–	0	–	1	7	–	4	–	1
Arizona	6	–	1	–	0	9	–	2	–	0
Arizona State	4	–	3	–	0	7	–	5	–	0
New Mexico	3	–	4	–	0	4	–	6	–	1
UTEP	3	–	4	–	0	4	–	7	–	0
Colorado State	2	–	3	–	1	4	–	6	–	1
Utah	1	–	5	–	0	1	–	10	–	0
Wyoming	1	–	6	–	0	2	–	9	–	0
$ – Conference champion

The 1974 Arizona Wildcats football team represented the University of Arizona in the Western Athletic Conference (WAC) during the 1974 NCAA Division I football season. In their second season under head coach Jim Young, the Wildcats compiled a 9–2 record (6–1 against WAC opponents), finished in second place in the WAC, and outscored their opponents, 263 to 174. The team played home games at Arizona Stadium in Tucson, Arizona.

Despite a 9–2 record, the Wildcats were not invited to a bowl game due to not winning the WAC (BYU defeated Arizona in their head-to-head matchup to win the WAC) and at the time, under WAC rules, only the conference winner would earn a bowl bid, in which case, the Fiesta Bowl.

The team's statistical leaders included Bruce Hill with 1,814 passing yards, Jim Upchurch with 1,004 rushing yards, and Theopolis Bell with 700 receiving yards. Linebacker Mark Jacobs led the team with a school record 200 total tackles.

== Schedule ==
Date	Opponent	Rank	Site	Result	Attendance	Source
September 14	San Diego State*	No. 17	Arizona Stadium; Tucson, AZ	W 17–10	38,914	
September 21	at Indiana*	No. 17	Memorial Stadium; Bloomington, IN	W 35–20	35,683	
September 28	at New Mexico	No. 15	University Stadium; Albuquerque, NM (rivalry)	W 15–10	24,404	
October 5	UTEP	No. 12	Arizona Stadium; Tucson, AZ	W 42–13	38,051	
October 12	at Utah	No. 12	Robert Rice Stadium; Salt Lake City, UT	W 41–8	24,082	
October 19	at No. 17 Texas Tech*	No. 9	Jones Stadium; Lubbock, TX	L 8–17	40,231	
October 26	BYU	No. 16	Arizona Stadium; Tucson, AZ	L 13–37	34,116	
November 9	Colorado State		Arizona Stadium; Tucson, AZ	W 34–21	33,116	
November 16	at Air Force*		Falcon Stadium; Colorado Springs, CO	W 27–24	34,802	
November 23	Wyoming		Arizona Stadium; Tucson, AZ	W 21–14	34,467	
November 30	Arizona State		Arizona Stadium; Tucson, AZ (rivalry)	W 10–0	40,872	
*Non-conference game; Rankings from AP Poll released prior to the game

== Game summaries ==
=== Texas Tech ===
In a matchup of two top-20 teams, Arizona fell on the wrong end of it against Texas Tech, and lost in a low-scoring game for their first defeat of the season and ended their chances for an undefeated record.

=== BYU ===
After losing on the road at Texas Tech, the Wildcats returned home and faced BYU in a big test in the WAC. The Cougars would outplay the Wildcats to give Arizona their second straight loss and take control of the WAC. The loss ultimately prevented Arizona from winning the WAC, as BYU went on to clinch both the conference title and Fiesta Bowl berth.

=== Arizona State ===
In the regular season finale, Arizona battled Arizona State in the annual rivalry matchup. The Wildcats were looking to break a nine-game losing streak against the Sun Devils, with their last win occurring in 1964. Both teams held each other scoreless through the first three quarters before Arizona broke through in the fourth for a 10–0 shutout victory, and finally ended their decade-long streak of misery to ASU. To date, this remains the most recent shutout in the rivalry series and the only home win over the Sun Devils in the 1970s for the Wildcats. Also, it turned out to be Young's first and only win against ASU as Arizona's coach, as he would lose to them for the rest of his tenure. The victory led to the Wildcats winning nine games in a season for the first time in school history.

== Roster ==
1974 Arizona Wildcats football team roster
Players
Coaches
Offense

Pos.	#	Name	Class
WR	23	Keith Hartwig	So
WR	86	Scott Piper	Jr
OT	76	Brian Murray	Jr
OT	70	Allyn Haynes	Sr
G	66	Jay Bledsoe	Sr
OC	53	Bob Windisch	Jr
G	71	Greg Hodgeson	So
G	68	Paul Schmidt	Jr
FL	18	T Bell	Jr
QB	1	Bruce Hill	Jr
RB	2	Willie Hamilton	Sr
RB	3	Jim Upchurch	Sr
RB	6	Tex Randolph	Jr
TE	85	Tom Camptell	Sr
TE	88	Dan Howard	Jr

Defense

Pos.	#	Name	Class
DT	77	Mike Dawson	Jr
NG	56	Glenn Gresham	Sr
DT	78	Grant Swanson	Jr
LB	41	Mark Jacobs	So
LB	46	Obra Erby	So
NG	93	Jon Abbott	Fr
DE	87	Rex Naumetz	Sr
DE	83	Willis Barrett	So
CB	17	Vince Phason	Sr
CB	28	Rousell Williams	Sr
FS	10	Mike Battles	Sr
FS	40	Dennis Anderson	Jr
SS	34	Joe Colace	So
SS	31	Greg Preston	So

Special teams

Pos.	#	Name	Class
DE	32	Mitch Hoopes	Sr

Head coach

- Jim Young

Coordinators/assistant coaches

- Larry Smith
- Bill Belknap
- Willie Peete
- John Mackovic
- Bob Bockrath
- Sharkey Price
- Mike Hankwitz
- Jeff Green
- Charlie Lee

Legend

- (C) Team captain
- (S) Suspended
- (I) Ineligible
- Injured
- Redshirt
