= History of Maryland Terrapins football =

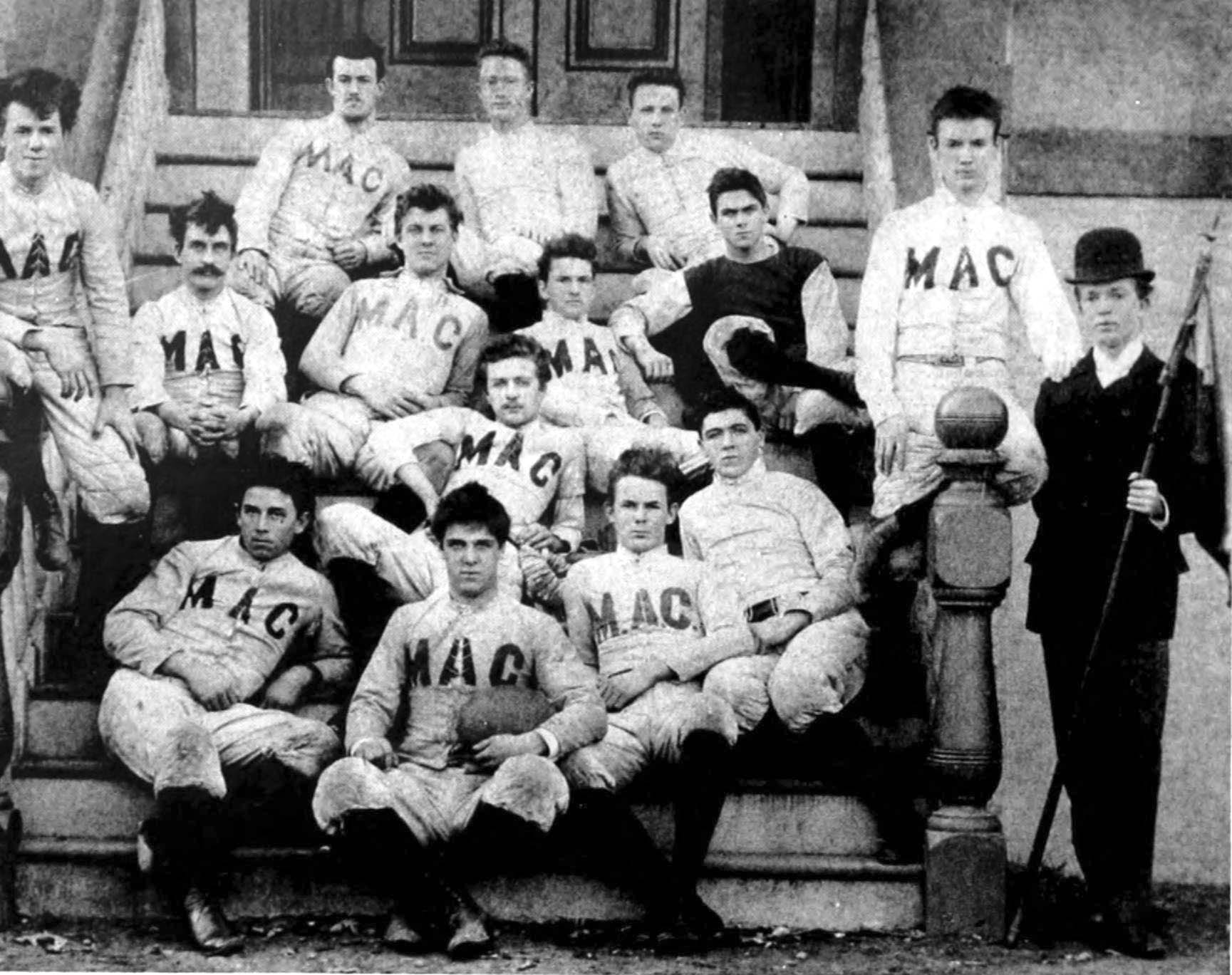
First team of Maryland University, known as the "Maryland Aggies", pictured in 1892

The Maryland Terrapins football team represents the University of Maryland, College Park in the sport of American football. The Terrapins compete in the NCAA Division I Football Bowl Subdivision (FBS) and the Big Ten Conference. The Terrapins joined the Big Ten Conference on July 1, 2014, following 62 years in the Atlantic Coast Conference as a founding member. The Terrapins are currently coached by Mike Locksley. Since 1950, the Terrapins have played their home games at Maryland Stadium in College Park, Maryland with occasional home games from time to time in Baltimore, making them one of two FBS football teams in the Baltimore–Washington metropolitan area (Navy Midshipmen) and the closest Football Bowl Subdivision team to Washington, D.C. The team's official colors of red, white, black, and gold have been in use in some combination since the 1920s and are taken from Maryland's state flag, and the Terrapins nickname — often abbreviated as "Terps" — was adopted in 1933 after a turtle species native to the state.

== Early history (1892–1946) ==
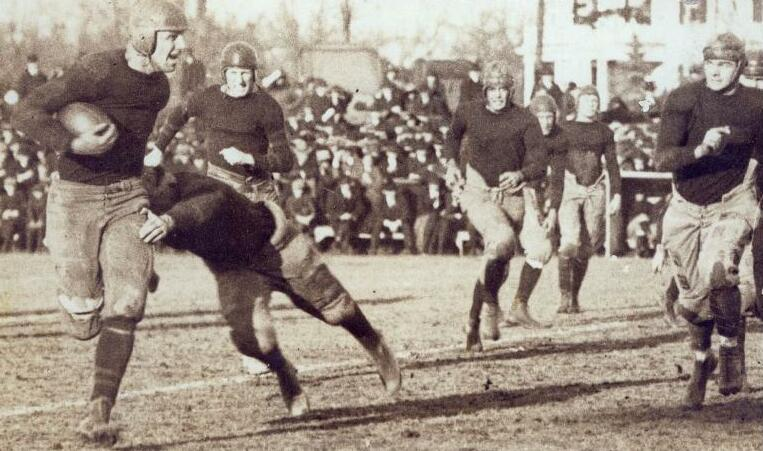
A game between Maryland and intrastate rival Johns Hopkins in 1919.

In 1892, the school then known as the Maryland Agricultural College fielded its first officially sanctioned college football team. They went scoreless in all three of that season's games, but the following year, posted a perfect record of 6–0. For the first two decades of the program, the team primarily competed against local universities and high schools due to the prohibitive nature of long-distance travel at the time.

In 1911, Harry C. "Curley" Byrd became head coach and held that position for more than two decades until he was named the university president. In 1921, Maryland joined the Southern Conference where it remained for thirty years. Between 1935 and 1946, the school had several coaches that achieved fame elsewhere: Frank Dobson, a former assistant coach under John Heisman; Clark Shaughnessy, architect of Stanford's undefeated 1940 turnaround; and Paul "Bear" Bryant, who later became the long-time Alabama head coach. Bryant resigned after one season when a player he had suspended was reinstated by President Byrd.

== Jim Tatum (1947–1955) ==
Jim Tatum was hired in 1947, after a brief stint at Oklahoma where he had led the Sooners to a conference championship in his only season there. He was Maryland's sixth head coach in eight years, but Tatum stayed for nine seasons and became the school's most successful head coach in modern history. During his tenure, he led Maryland to two national championships (one retroactive), three conference championships, three perfect seasons, six top-20 final rankings, and five bowl game appearances. Seven of his players were named first-team All-Americans, including five consensus All-Americans. Under Tatum, Maryland finished every season with a winning record.

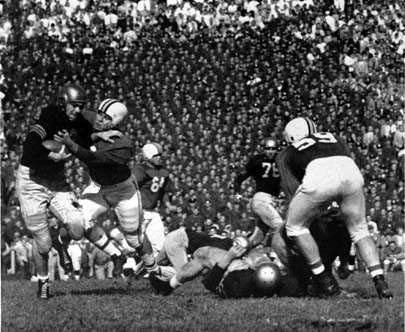
Maryland in action against Navy in 1952.

After the 1947 season, the Terrapins participated in their first bowl game, the 1948 Gator Bowl, in which they tied Georgia, 20–20. NCAA season-scoring leader Lu Gambino recorded all three Maryland touchdowns. In 1949, Maryland again played in the Gator Bowl, where they defeated 20th-ranked Missouri, 20–7. The Terrapins finished the season ranked 14th by the Associated Press. Maryland's current home field, Maryland Stadium, was constructed in 1950, and named in honor of former coach and contemporary Maryland president Curly Byrd. Maryland started the 1950 season ranked 15th and defeated Navy, 35–21, in the Byrd Stadium dedication game.

The Terrapins won the 1951 Southern Conference co-championship alongside the Virginia Military Institute. Their perfect season culminated with an upset over first-ranked Tennessee in the Sugar Bowl. At the time, however, the wire services released their final rankings before the bowl games, and Maryland finished third in the Associated Press Poll. Several selectors, including analyst Jeff Sagarin, have retroactively credited Maryland with the national championship. In 1953, Maryland and six other schools split from the Southern Conference to form the Atlantic Coast Conference. That year, Maryland shut-out two 11th-ranked teams: Mississippi, 38–0, and Alabama, 21–0, won the ACC co-championship alongside Duke, and were named the national champions as the only undefeated and untied team in the nation. The Terrapins were defeated by fourth-ranked Oklahoma in the Orange Bowl. After the 1955 season, Tatum resigned to return to North Carolina, where he soon died of Rocky Mountain spotted fever.

== Tommy Mont (1956–1958) ==
After Tatum resigned to coach at his own alma mater, North Carolina, Tommy Mont was appointed as his replacement. In his first season, Maryland was riddled with injuries and posted a disappointing 2–7–1 record. Mont had great difficulty recruiting to the same standard that his predecessor had, but managed to secure Rod Breedlove, a highly touted guard prospect. Breedlove later went on to play eight years in the NFL and made a Pro Bowl appearance.

In 1957, the Terrapins improved to a 5–5 record. The highlight of the season was a game featuring Jim Tatum's return to College Park, Maryland. On October 19, at Byrd Stadium, Maryland met the North Carolina team led by their former head coach. The game also had in attendance Queen Elizabeth II who had expressed a wish to see her first game of American football. The Tar Heels were ranked 6th in the nation and possessed a 3–1 record. The Terrapins, on the other hand, were 1–3. In the first quarter, Maryland halfback Howard Dare fumbled and North Carolina linebacker Jack Lineberger recovered the ball on the Terrapins' 44-yard line. North Carolina was subsequently forced to punt, but recovered it at the Maryland 35. On the ensuing possession, Tar Heel halfback Daley Goff rushed 11 yards for a touchdown. In the third quarter, Maryland gained excellent field position when Goff received a bad punt snap and the Terps took over on the Carolina 38-yard line. Maryland quarterback Bob Rusevlyan later scored on a one-yard sneak. In the fourth quarter, halfback Ted Kershner broke away for an 81-yard touchdown run. Fullback Jim Joyce capped a 67-yard drive with a 13-yard rush for a score. With a final result of 21–7, the Maryland players carried Mont to the Queen and Prince Philip's box. Mont said it was a day that "I will revel in for the rest of my life."

In 1958, however, Maryland again backslided with a 4–6 record and Mont subsequently resigned.

== Tom Nugent (1959–1965) ==
At the first practice before the 1959 season, new Terps head football coach Tom Nugent addressed his team, "Hi, I'm Tom Nugent and I hate West Virginia." The Mountaineers were Maryland's first opponent of the season, and Nugent guided the Terrapins to a 27–7 victory in that game.

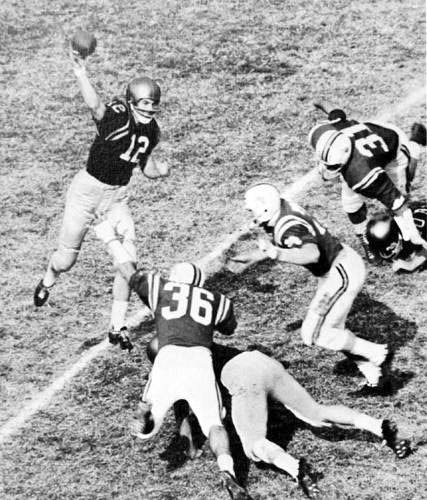
Roger Staubach of Navy tosses a pass against Maryland, 1964.

In 1961, Nugent's Maryland team became the first college football program in the nation to put players' names on the back of their jerseys. That season, he led the Terrapins to the best season of his tenure and finished with a 7–3 record. The Terrapins also defeated seventh-ranked Syracuse, 22–21.

Nugent amassed a 36–34 record during his tenure at Maryland. He remained the last Maryland coach to win his inaugural game with the team until Ralph Friedgen matched that feat in 2001.

Under Nugent, in 1962, Maryland integrated its football team after Darryl Hill caught the eye of Maryland assistant coach Lee Corso. who had been encouraged by Nugent to find a black athlete to play for his team. Hill became not only the first African-American football player at Maryland but the first in the Atlantic Coast Conference and at any college or university in "the old South."

== Lou Saban (1966) ==
In a surprising move, Lou Saban unexpectedly resigned as head coach of the AFL's Buffalo Bills in January 1966 to the head football coach position at Maryland. He said he was leaving because "there can be little left to conquer in professional football". His record at Buffalo was 36–17–3. Saban, however, only stayed at Maryland for one season in which the team posted a 4–6 record, as he departed back to the AFL to become head coach of the Denver Broncos.

== Bob Ward (1967–1968) ==
In 1967, Bob Ward returned to his alma mater to take the head coaching position. Before the season, 12 players failed to academically qualify to play on the team. During that first season, the team lost all nine of their games for the first time in the modern era. Ward's second year saw slight improvement, recording eight losses but with wins over North Carolina and South Carolina. However, many of his players were growing increasingly disgruntled with his coaching style.

In March 1969, Maryland athletic director Jim Kehoe called a meeting among 120 players, Ward, his assistants, and a three-man committee. Thirty-one of those players told Ward that they no longer wished to play for the Terrapins and accused him of using intimidation tactics, including verbal and physical abuse. Ward listened to the player's grievances, but did not respond at the time. Two days later, he resigned as head coach. Later that year, Sports Illustrated interviewed Ward, and he said:

"I won't go into all the specifics, but it wasn't the good players who started it. It was the guys who couldn't fight their way out of a paper bag, guys who sat on the bench and couldn't take it and a couple of pip-squeak cub newspaper guys who don't know what football's all about ... He gets on the campus newspaper and all of a sudden he's got power he never thought of having."

The Diamondback, the university's student newspaper, had criticized Ward for moving the team into one dormitory, which forced some other students out. Ward stated that the move was done on the advice of Kehoe—which Kehoe denied—and with the intent of focusing the players on their studies and building camaraderie. Ward and his assistants monitored the players' academic performance, enforced class attendance, and placed curfews on perceived troublemakers. Ward stated that, in his first year, only two of his players failed out of the school that he claimed had a history of poor athlete academics. He complained that he was a scapegoat and that there had been poor communication between him and Kehoe. In fact, Penn State head coach Joe Paterno was concerned with the situation surrounding Ward's resignation and sent a letter to the American Football Coaches Association demanding an investigation. Paterno said:

"I don't know who's right or wrong, but ... I don't think it's a good thing for a squad to fire a coach. As an association, we ought to know what happened. If a university fired an English professor because his class didn't like the way he was doing things, I know darn well that the American Association of University Professors would want to know what happened."

== Roy Lester (1969–1971) ==
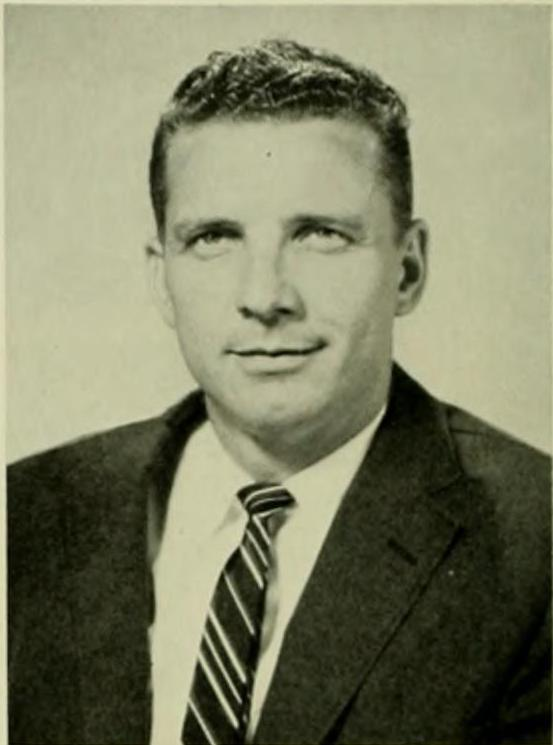
Coach Lester

In 1969, Roy Lester was hired as Maryland's fourth head coach in five years.

Lester had previously twice applied for the Maryland head coach position, but didn't get it. The Daytona Beach Morning Journal speculated that Lester's undisclosed salary probably matched that of Ward: $20,000.

Lester reintroduced the split-T formation at Maryland, which Jim Tatum had used to great effect there in the 1950s.

Lester's philosophy was explained by the Maryland sports information director Jack Zane: "the pass should open up the defense for the running game."In the sixth game of his first season, Maryland's starting quarterback, junior Dennis O'Hara, was injured in a loss at South Carolina, and was replaced by sophomore Jeff Shugars.

In the season's penultimate game, Maryland lost to Penn State, 48–0. Penn State halfback Lydell Mitchell had been recruited by Lester and originally intended to go to Maryland before he opted for Penn State instead. Lester was bothered by a similar situation with fullback Franco Harris, whose high school coach was a friend of Lester's. Lester attributed Maryland's football woes to the turnover at head coach and lack of depth because of recruitment shortcomings. Maryland won the finale against Virginia to finish the season with a 3–7 record.

In 1970, Lester's Terrapins finished with a 2–9 record. After an upset loss in the season opener against Villanova, 21–3, Lester shuffled the roster. He switched the positions of eight players, which included Tom Miller from fullback to linebacker.The season prior, Miller had gained 629 yards, the second-most ever by a Maryland sophomore.

After losing their first five games, Maryland beat South Carolina on Homecoming weekend, 21–15, which prompted Maryland fans to tear down the goalposts in celebration. In the 25-mile per hour winds, the Terrapins capitalized on the Gamecocks' poor punting game, which included one blocked punt.

Two weeks later, Maryland was beaten by Clemson, which scored 21 points in the fourth quarter to win, 24–11.

With the loss, Maryland slid to a 1–7 record, and Lester said he was giving serious consideration to stepping down before the next season. He said, "If I'm not doing the proper job I'm willing to relinquish the job. I took this loss very personally."

In 1971, some observers considered Maryland, which returned 37 lettermen, to be the dark horse in the Atlantic Coast Conference (ACC). Lester said he expected a winning season and that "a lot of people may be surprised."

However, the Terrapins dropped the season opener to underdog Villanova once again, 28–13.Star-News called it the most stunning of five upsets in the ACC teams' opening weekend, rating it ahead of NC State's loss to Kent State, Virginia's loss to Navy, South Carolina's win against Georgia Tech, and Duke's win against Florida.Maryland won the following week against NC State, but then dropped five straight before beating the Virginia Military Institute on Homecoming. Maryland closed the season with losses to Penn State, Clemson, and Virginia to again finish with a 2–9 record.Lester was fired at the conclusion of the 1971 season. Athletic director Jim Kehoe cited Maryland's worst record in the ACC for two consecutive years and stated his goal of making Maryland a "nationally ranked caliber" team.

Kehoe also said, "financial factors are a serious consideration", and that home game attendance had fallen to its lowest point, which threatened the financial well-being of the athletic department. Lester was replaced by Jerry Claiborne, who later went on to considerable success in the position.

In September 1973, Maryland All-American guard Paul Vellano, then playing under Claiborne, said of the past coaches' difficulties: "A lot of the kids said that Ward was a good coach but that he had a lot of bad apples. Lester was a high school coach and nobody had ever heard of him. I can't understand it. We had nine freshman who were All-Americans my first year here under Lester. Maybe if they had let him stay he could have done the job.

One of Lester's lasting contributions was the recruitment of future Maryland and NFL star Randy White.

At the end of his tenure, Lester had a combined collegiate coaching record of 7–25.

== Jerry Claiborne (1972–1981) ==
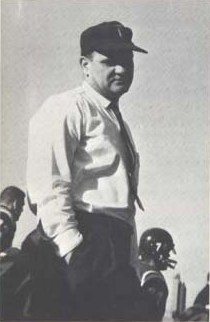
Jerry Claiborne engineered a turnaround of Maryland's fortunes beginning in 1972.

In 1972, Jerry Claiborne took over as head coach of the Terrapins, which had only nine wins in the past five years. In his first season, Maryland improved to 5–5–1, and the following year, they reached their first bowl game in almost two decades. The team steadily improved until his fifth season, 1976, when they finished the regular season with an 11–0 record, their first perfect mark since Tatum's 1955 squad. Boomer Esiason later described Claiborne's coaching style as "vanilla", and said his strategy was "run right, run left, run up the middle, punt, and play good defense." He went on to say, "But, there's no question he made me a tougher player . . . We'd do drills where the quarterback had to take on a linebacker. It was like he had a sign on our back, 'Hit us, we're stupid'. It made you a tougher player."

In 1974, Maryland had a preseason rank of 14th and later beat 17th-ranked NC State to win the ACC championship. The Terrapins were defeated by 20th-ranked Tennessee in the Liberty Bowl and finished the season ranked 13th. In 1975, Maryland again won the ACC and defeated 13th-ranked Florida in the Gator Bowl to finish 13th in the nation. That season, the Terrapins led the ACC in total offense with 375.2 yards per game. Maryland started 1976 ranked 12th, and quarterback Mark Manges led them to eleven consecutive wins to secure their third straight ACC championship. Maryland's loss to sixth-ranked Houston in the Cotton Bowl Classic, 30–21, ended any hopes for a national championship.

In 1978, Maryland beat 20th-ranked NC State and finished with a ranking of 20th. The game that pitted 11th-ranked Maryland against 12th-ranked Clemson has been described as one of the most exciting games of the era. The "big-play caravan" ultimately saw Clemson triumph, 28–24. From 1974 to 1978, Claiborne and the Terrapins secured five consecutive bowl game berths and three consecutive ACC championships. Maryland made it to a sixth bowl game in 1980. After the 1981 season, Claiborne left the program for his alma mater, Kentucky, and was replaced by Bobby Ross, an assistant coach for the Kansas City Chiefs.

== Bobby Ross (1982–1986) ==
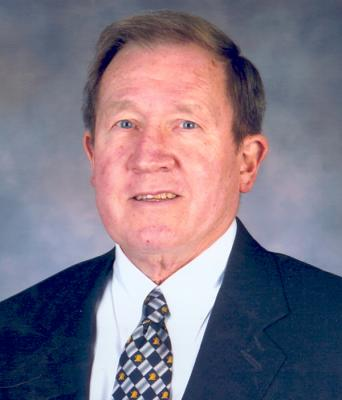
Coach Ross

In a surprising choice, former Maryland assistant coach and Citadel head coach Bobby Ross, who was not a big name at the time, was selected as head coach in 1982. In contrast to Claiborne's style, Ross implemented a high-powered offense. He replaced the I-veer triple option with an NFL-style offense that emphasized dropback passes, bootlegs, and play action passes. This change in tactics and strategy enabled starting quarterback Boomer Esiason the opportunity to excel to a degree not seen under Claiborne the season prior. Esiason said, "Ross has an uncanny knack of putting players in a position to not only succeed, but to overachieve . . . If he didn't show up at Maryland, I don't know what would have happened to me. I don't know if I would have turned into the player I was and played in the NFL." In the following years, several Maryland quarterbacks went on to careers in the National Football League (NFL), and the school was nicknamed "Quarterback U" as a result.

In Ross's inaugural season, Maryland defeated 10th-ranked North Carolina, and then edged Miami before their most important conference game of the season against the 1981 national champions, the Clemson Tigers. Between 1974 and 1988, either Clemson or Maryland won the ACC title all but three years. Clemson had lost to the 1980 national champions, seventh-ranked Georgia, 13–7, and tied Boston College, 17–17, after the opposing quarterback, Doug Flutie, led a comeback. Clemson was therefore unable to defend their NCAA championship, but either Clemson or Maryland, with perfect conference records, would secure the ACC title. Thus, decades before the official ACC Championship Game, 1982 saw a rare de facto title match. Clemson scored first, then pulled away 14–7 before half. In the second half, a favorable wind twice yielded Maryland excellent field position, Esiason threw for two rapid-fire touchdowns and a two-point conversion, and the defense held Clemson at bay. However, the Terrapins also turned the ball over five times in the second half and lost, 24–22. With the win, Clemson won the ACC and Maryland finished second. Immediately after the game, the NCAA announced its investigation into Clemson recruiting had found improprieties. As a result, the Tigers were denied a bowl game and television coverage in the following season. The ACC instituted further punishment, making Clemson ineligible for a conference title for the next two years. Maryland finished 1982 ranked 20th after losing to ninth-ranked Washington in the Aloha Bowl. In 1983, Maryland lost to third-ranked Auburn and 20th-ranked West Virginia, but beat 17th-ranked Pittsburgh and third-ranked North Carolina. Clemson and Maryland once more met with perfect ACC records, and Maryland again lost, this time blown out, 52–27. Despite the loss, Maryland was awarded the conference championship because of the sanctions against Clemson.

In 1984, Maryland defeated the defending national champions, sixth-ranked Miami, in what was then the biggest comeback in college football history and judged by some as the most exciting. At half time, Maryland trailed Miami, 31–0. Back-up quarterback Frank Reich replaced Stan Gelbaugh and proceeded to throw four touchdown passes, and capitalizing on Miami errors, the Terrapins won, 42–40. The recovery from the 31-point halftime deficit stood as the greatest college football comeback for the next 22 years, until the record was finally broken by Michigan State against Northwestern. Reich later repeated the feat in his professional career when he led the Buffalo Bills to overcome a 32-point deficit and set the NFL comeback record. That season, Maryland also defeated 17th-ranked West Virginia and 20th-ranked Clemson, and secured the ACC championship. In the postseason, they edged Tennessee, 28–27, in the Sun Bowl and finished 12th in the nation. Maryland entered the 1985 season with a number-one preseason rank, and set its all-time home attendance record in Byrd Stadium with an average of 49,385 over five games. However, they dropped to a ranking of 17th in Week 2, and then out of the polls in Week 4 after a shutout by Michigan. Despite the early setbacks, the Terrapins finished undefeated in six conference games to take the ACC championship for the third consecutive year. Maryland defeated Syracuse, 35–18, in the Cherry Bowl and earned a final ranking of 18th. In 1986, the Terrapins posted a mediocre 5–5–1 record.

After the season, Ross resigned as head coach. He expressed frustration over the university's failure to improve Byrd Stadium and its associated facilities. Ross had shown recruits stadium and facility renovation plans as an indication of the program's direction, and when they did not come to fruition, he felt that he had misled the players. Ross also stated that he was hurt by "innuendo, insinuation, and guilt by association" with respect to the cocaine-induced death of Maryland basketball star Len Bias. He said, "I feel the football team has represented the university well, both on and off the field." The athletics department investigation report had commended the propriety of the football program, but university chancellor John B. Slaughter did not offer his vocal support for Ross until a month later.

== Joe Krivak (1987–1991) ==
Maryland athletics in general were marred by the death of Len Bias, and the football team was no exception. After Ross resigned, offensive coordinator and quarterbacks coach Joe Krivak was promoted to head coach. This was the beginning of a lackluster period for Terrapins football. From 1987 to 2000, the Terrapins went 55–88 overall (.385) with only two winning seasons and one bowl appearance. The Krivak era was met with a brutal schedule with non-conference opponents consisting of national powers Michigan, Miami, Penn State, and Syracuse among others. After a 4–7 season in 1987, a controversial loss to Virginia in the final game of 1988 cost the team a sixth win for bowl eligibility. In 1989, Maryland tied Joe Paterno's 13th-ranked Penn State. The following season, the Terrapins beat 25th-ranked West Virginia and upset 8th-ranked Virginia. Maryland received a bid to the Independence Bowl and tied Louisiana Tech in what would be their only postseason appearance during this period. Athletic director Andy Geiger rewarded Krivak with a five-year contract extension, but the 1991 season unraveled after a rash of injuries, and Maryland had its worst finish in two decades with a 2–9 mark. After public criticism from several players, Krivak felt he lost credibility as the head coach and resigned on December 6.

== Mark Duffner (1992–1996) ==
Geiger named Holy Cross head coach Mark Duffner as Krivak's replacement. Duffner had amassed a 60–5–1 record and two undefeated seasons in his six years at Holy Cross. At Maryland, he installed a run and shoot offense which shattered many school records, as of the end of the 2020 season, which still stand to the present day. However, his defenses were notoriously weak, usually giving up points so quickly that even his prolific offense couldn't keep up. For example, in the 1993 game against Virginia Tech, the Terrapins lost by 27 points despite gaining 649 yards of total offense. During this time, quarterbacks Scott Milanovich and John Kaleo set numerous school records for passing under Duffner, most of which still stand. In 1993, Maryland earned the dubious honor of most yards allowed per game, a record which also stands: in eleven games, the Terrapins surrendered 6,083 yards—an average of 553.0 yards per game. Maryland also gave up 236 more points than they scored, the worst point differential in school history. After the season, Duffner reorganized his staff by firing three assistant coaches. The team showed moderate improvement the next two years, and in 1995 finished 6–5, which was the first winning record since 1990. However, Maryland backslid in 1996 with a 5–6 record and a struggling offense. Duffner was fired after the season, having accumulated a combined record of 20–35.

== Ron Vanderlinden (1997–2000) ==
Ron Vanderlinden was hired as head coach for the 1997 season under a five-year contract. Vanderlinden had helped engineer turnarounds at Northwestern as defensive coordinator and at Colorado as a defensive assistant. The 1995 Northwestern team in particular had shocked observers when it recorded a 10–2 season and the Big Ten championship. In 1999, Maryland showed signs of significant improvement, and a winning season appeared certain when Maryland possessed a 5–2 record. The Terrapins, however, then suffered a three-game losing streak. In their finale against Virginia, the Terrapins needed a win to garner a likely invitation to either the Aloha Bowl or Oahu Bowl—a Maryland alumnus was the chief executive officer of both events. The Terrapins came from behind and held the lead, 30–27, with 5:18 left to play. They regained possession with 1:40 remaining, but an inexperienced quarterback unintentionally stopped the clock by going out of bounds. After the ensuing punt, Virginia mounted a touchdown drive to win the game and end Maryland's bowl hopes. Despite narrowly missing a winning season, Vanderlinden was granted a two-year contract extension. In 2000, Maryland again fell short of a winning season and bowl game. The Terrapins entered their season closer with a 5–5 record, and again fell, this time in a rout by 24th-ranked Georgia Tech. Vanderlinden was fired the following day.

Despite the failure to deliver a winning season, Vanderlinden did oversee substantive improvement in the program. In 1998, the Terrapins were one of the most improved teams in defense, scoring defense, passing defense, and rushing. In 1999, Maryland allowed a conference low of 11 sacks compared with 56 in 1997. In that same period, Maryland also improved from last to first in the conference in rushing, due in large part to Heisman Trophy candidate and school career rushing leader LaMont Jordan. During Vanderlinden's tenure, Maryland also recruited several key players who were instrumental in the team's later success.

== Ralph Friedgen (2001–2010) ==
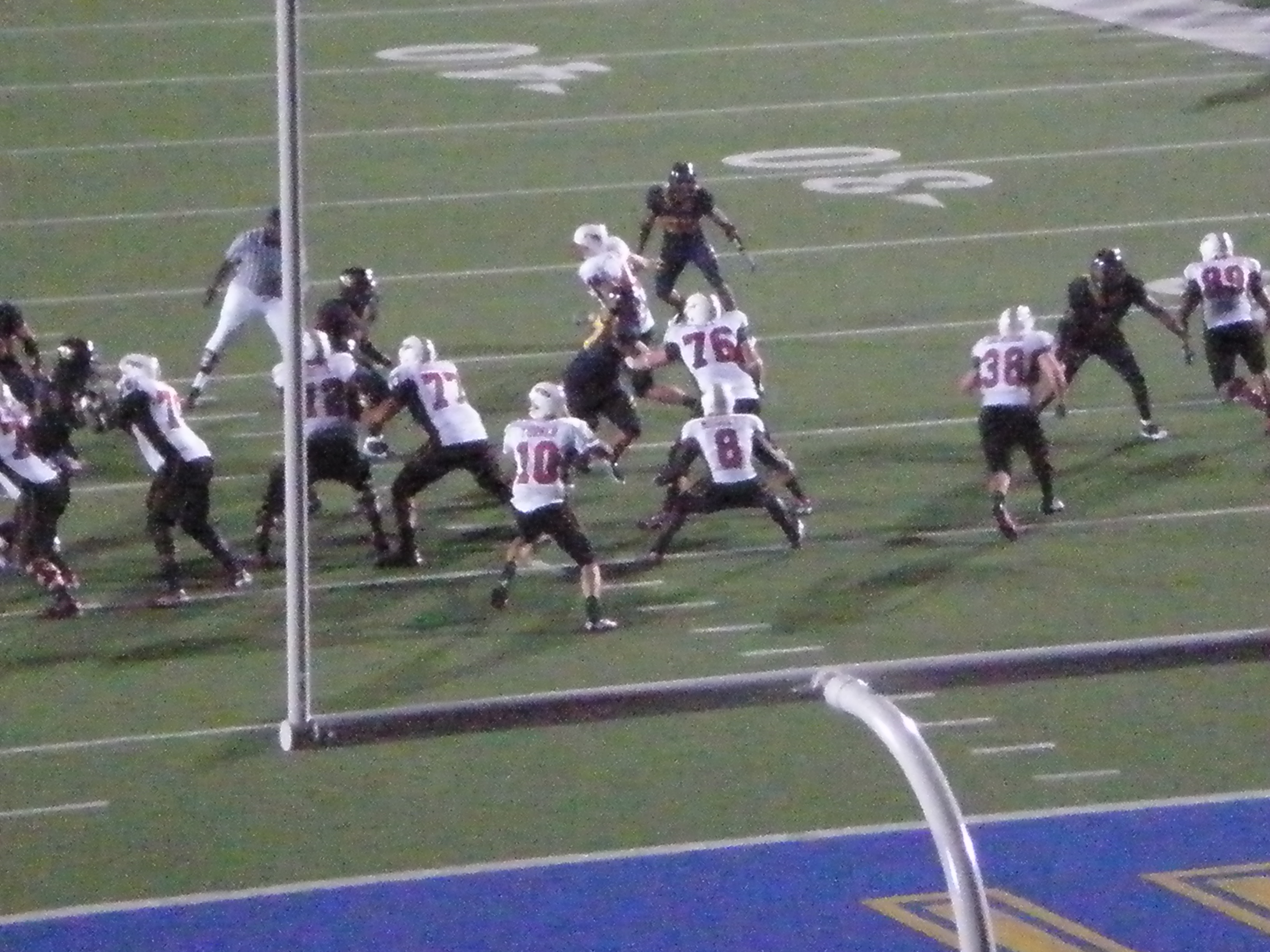
First game of the 2009 season, versus the California Golden Bears

Ralph Friedgen, a former Maryland player and assistant under Bobby Ross, was hired as Vanderlinden's replacement for the 2001 season. Friedgen had previously been denied an interview for the position twice by his alma mater. While offensive coordinator at Georgia Tech, he had been described as an "offensive genius", and Friedgen later received similar plaudits while at Maryland. When he took over, Maryland had not won a bowl game in 16 years and had only one winning season since 1990.

In 2001, Maryland won its first four games and entered the AP Poll for the first time since September 1995. Maryland beat 15th-ranked Georgia Tech in overtime when placekicker Nick Novak, the ACC's future all-time scoring leader, equalized and then won the game with 46- and 26-yard field goals, thereby ensuring a winning season and bowl appearance. In Tallahassee, 18th-ranked Florida State broke a stalemate in the fourth quarter to hand Maryland its only defeat of the regular season, 52–31. Maryland closed the year with a win over NC State, which secured the ACC championship and made the Terrapins the first team other than Florida State to take the title outright since the Seminoles joined the conference in 1991. Sixth-ranked Maryland then faced fifth-ranked Florida in the Orange Bowl—their first-ever BCS appearance, and their first major bowl of any sort since the 1977 Cotton Bowl. The Terrapins lost, 56–23, and finished with a 10–2 record and ranked 10th in the nation.

In 2002, Maryland had a preseason rank of 20th, but their first three games included a shutout by 12th-ranked Notre Dame, 22–0, and a loss to 16th-ranked Florida State, 37–10. The Terrapins rallied to defeat 13th-ranked West Virginia and 17th-ranked NC State, while losing only to Virginia. That loss, however, prevented Maryland from earning a share of the ACC championship alongside Florida State. The Terrapins routed Tennessee in the Peach Bowl, 30–3, and finished with an 11–3 record and final ranking of 18th. Maryland began the 2003 season with losses to Northern Illinois and eighth-ranked Florida State. They later defeated 23rd-ranked West Virginia, but were edged by Georgia Tech. In the postseason, 24th-ranked Maryland delivered a second crushing defeat against 20th-ranked West Virginia in the Gator Bowl, 41–7, and finished the season ranked 17th. The New York Times computer poll ranked Maryland third in the nation, behind only split-national champions Louisiana State and Southern California. The 2004 season was Friedgen's first with a losing record. Maryland finished with a 5–6 mark that included an overtime loss to West Virginia, 19–16. The highlight of the season was an upset victory over fifth-ranked Florida State, which was Maryland's first against the Seminoles and their first win against a top-10 team since 1990. The Terrapins again ended the 2005 season with a 5–6 record. That season opened with a victory over Navy, which was the first meeting between the intrastate foes in 40 years.

In 2006, Maryland returned to a bowl game and finished with a 9–4 record. During the season, the Terrapins upset 19th-ranked Clemson, 13–12, and five of their games were won by four points or less. In the Champs Sports Bowl, Maryland beat Purdue, 24–7. In 2007, Maryland overcame extensive injuries to again secure a postseason appearance. During the season, unranked Maryland tallied two shocking upsets against 10th-ranked Rutgers, 34–24, and eighth-ranked Boston College, 42–35. They finished the season with a rout of NC State to attain bowl eligibility, 37–0, but lost to Oregon State in the Emerald Bowl, 21–14. According to the final Sagarin computer-generated rankings, Maryland had the second-hardest schedule in the ACC and the 27th-hardest schedule among Division I teams.

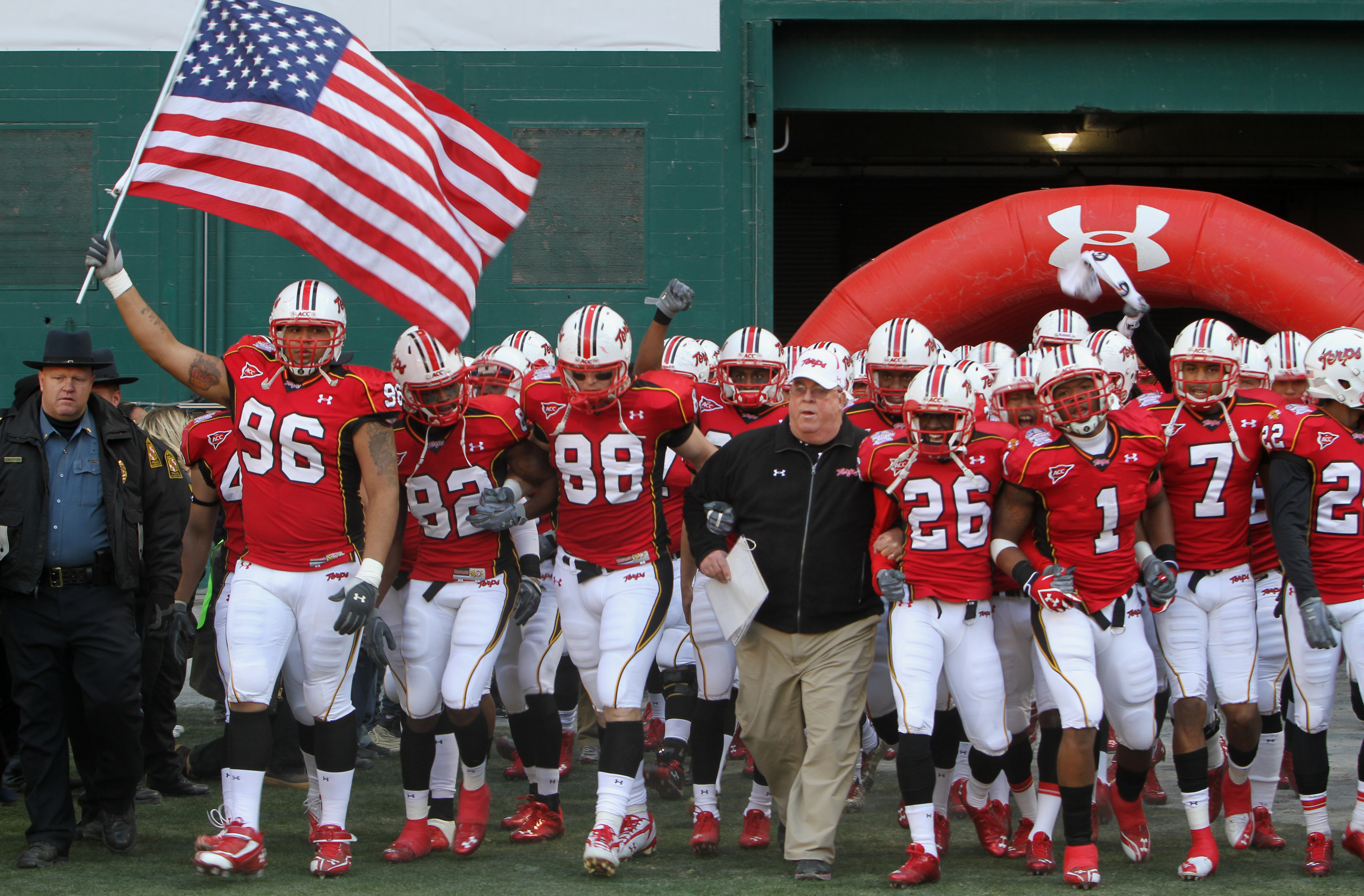
Ralph Friedgen leads his team before his final game, the 2010 Military Bowl.

Numerous observers described Maryland's 2008 season as "wildly inconsistent". The Terrapins defeated four of their five ranked opponents—25th-ranked California, 19th-ranked Clemson, 19th-ranked Wake Forest, and 17th-ranked North Carolina—but also lost to heavy underdogs Middle Tennessee and Virginia. Ultimately, Maryland defeated Nevada in the Humanitarian Bowl and finished the season with an 8–5 record. Before the 2009 season, many analysts projected the Terrapins to finish last or second-to-last in the Atlantic Division of the ACC, and expressed particular concern with the inexperienced offensive line. The prognostications proved accurate, and Maryland finished 2–10 for their first ten-loss season in program history. Maryland rebounded in 2010 to finish with a 9–4 record, including a win in the Military Bowl, and ranked 23rd in the AP Poll. The ACC named Friedgen Coach of the Year, while freshman quarterback Danny O'Brien became the first Terrapin ever named ACC Rookie of the Year. Citing lack of fan support, the athletic department bought out the final year of Friedgen's contract for $2 million.

== Randy Edsall (2011–2015) ==
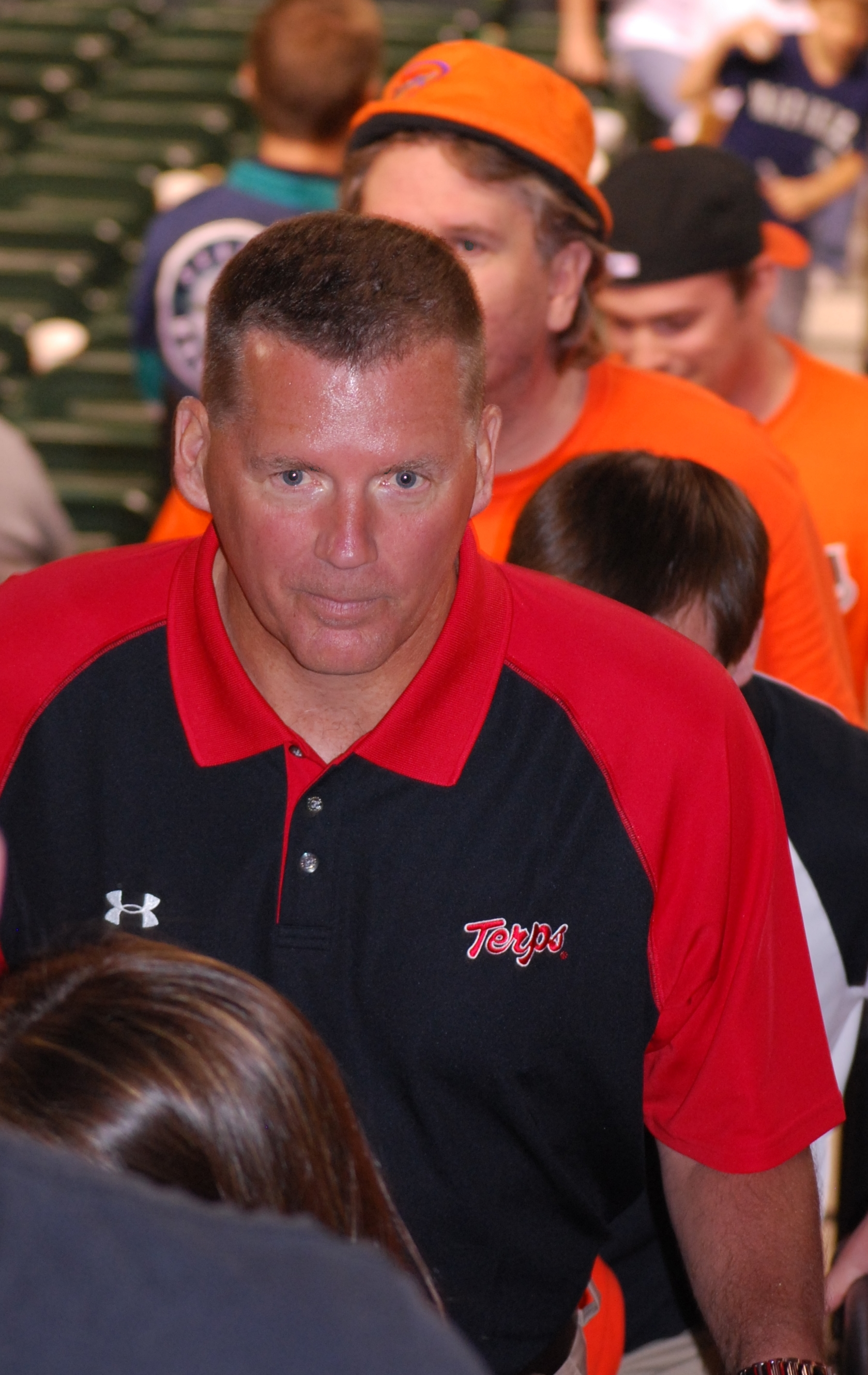
Coach Edsall

After Friedgen was let go, the Terrapins hired Randy Edsall away from Connecticut to be Maryland's head coach. The 2011 season was not a successful one for Maryland. After a nationally televised win over Miami, the Terrapins struggled for the remainder of the season. They only managed to record one more win (against FCS opponent Towson) and finished with a 2–10 record. The team did attract national attention for its "Maryland Pride" uniforms that were created by Under Armour, who had become the official outfitter of the Maryland Athletic Department in September 2008.

After the 2011 season, Edsall fired both his offensive coordinator Gary Crowton and his defensive coordinator Todd Bradford. Mike Locksley, who had been fired in 2011 from his head coaching position at New Mexico, was hired to be the new offensive coordinator. Locksley had previously worked at Maryland under head coaches Vanderlinden and Friedgen, and was the recruiting coordinator for Maryland before and during the three consecutive 10+ win seasons under Friedgen. Brian Stewart, who had been the defensive coordinator for the Houston Cougars, was hired to replace Bradford as the new defensive coordinator.

Edsall's 2012 team compiled a 4–8 record, losing four quarterbacks to injury, and eventually starting a linebacker at the position. The team's record improved from 2011 nonetheless but still not as much as fans, alumni and the administration had hoped.

The 2013 Maryland Terrapins football team under head coach Edsall improved to 7–6, capping the season with a loss in the Military Bowl to Marshall, The 61st and final season the Terrapins would be playing football in the Atlantic Coast Conference.

Edsall's 2014 Terps finished their regular season with a 7–5 record, comprising a 4–4 record in Big Ten Conference play that put them third in the Big Ten East Division, their Inaugural season in the Big Ten Conference . Maryland ended its season at the Foster Farms Bowl, where it lost to Stanford.

On October 11, 2015, Edsall was relieved of his duties with offensive coordinator Mike Locksley named as the interim head coach for the rest of the 2015 season.

== D. J. Durkin (2016–2018) ==
Durkin began serving as the head coach of the University of Maryland football team in 2015. Following the practice-related death of player Jordan McNair, Durkin was placed on leave in August 2018. Matt Canada was named acting head coach until further notice.

The University System of Maryland Board of Regents reinstated Durkin on October 30, 2018, causing protests and uproar. University of Maryland President Wallace Loh fired Durkin the next day.

== Matt Canada (Interim; 2018) ==
On August 11, 2018, Canada became interim head coach for the Maryland Terrapins after D.J. Durkin was put on administrative leave following the death of Jordan McNair, an offensive lineman for the Maryland Terrapins. After Mike Locksley was hired as the permanent head coach at Maryland going forward, Canada was relieved of the day-to-day head coaching responsibilities.

== Mike Locksley (since 2019–2026) ==
On December 4, 2018, Locksley was named head football coach at the University of Maryland, becoming the 21st full-time head coach in program history. Locksley led Maryland to a strong offensive start. In the first game of the 2019 season, Maryland defeated FCS affiliate Howard 79-0, following that up with a victory against 21st-ranked Syracuse 63-20. The 142 points in its first two games marked the Terps’ highest-ever scoring output in consecutive games, and the 63 points scored against Syracuse were the most points scored by a Maryland football team against a ranked opponent in program history. After starting strong and being ranked 21 in the AP polls, the Terrapins began struggling, finishing the season with a disappointing 3-9 record (1-5 Big 10), with a lone conference win at Rutgers in week 5.

Mike Locksley has been recognised for his recruiting efforts, and many Maryland fans are optimistic about the team’s future. On December 18, 2019, Maryland announced that they had gotten a commitment from 5-star recruit Rakim Jarrett, the Terrapins’ first 5-star recruit in over half a decade.

== See also ==
- List of Maryland Terrapins football seasons
