= 1974 All-Atlantic Coast Conference football team =

The 1974 All-Atlantic Coast Conference football team consists of American football players chosen by the Atlantic Coast Sports Writers Association (ACS) as the best at each position in Atlantic Coast Conference ("ACC") during the 1974 NCAA Division I football season.

The 1974 Maryland Terrapins football team won the 1974 ACC championship and led all other teams with six players selected as first-team players on the ACC team. Clemson and NC State each placed four players on the first team.

Two players were selected unanimously by all 123 voters: running back Stan Fritts of NC State and defensive tackle Randy White of Maryland. White broke the ACC career records for points and touchdowns. White also won the 1974 Outland Trophy, played 14 seasons in the National Football League, and was inducted into the College and Pro Football Hall of Fames.

== All-Atlantic Coast Conference selections ==
=== Offensive selections ===
==== Wide receivers ====
- Jimmy Jerome, North Carolina (ACS-1 [86])

==== Ends ====
- Bennie Cunningham, Clemson (ACS-1 [66])

==== Tackles ====
- Ken Peeples, Clemson (ACS-1 [94])
- Stan Rogers, Maryland (ACS-1 [93])

==== Guard ====
- Ken Huff, North Carolina (ACS-1 [107])
- Bob Blanchard, NC State (ACS-1 [73])

==== Center ====
- Justus Everett, NC State (ACS-1 [101])

==== Quarterback ====
- Chris Kupec, North Carolina (ACS-1 [54])
- Bob Avellini, Maryland (ACS-2 [39])

==== Backs ====
- Stan Fritts, NC State (ACS-1 [123])
- Louis Carter, Maryland (ACS-1 [109])
- James Betterson, North Carolina (ACS-1 [84])

=== Defensive selections ===
==== Linemen ====
- Randy White, Maryland (ACS-1 [123])
- Willie Anderson, Clemson (ACS-1 [56])
- J. T. Turner, Duke (ACS-1 [55])
- Ronnie Robinson, North Carolina (ACS-1 [49])

==== Linebackers ====
- Dick Ambrose, Virginia (ACS-1 [107])
- Keith Stoneback, Duke (ACS-1 [101])
- Harry Walters, Maryland (ACS-1 [90])

==== Defensive backs ====
- Bob Smith, Maryland (ACS-1 [90])
- Jeff Christopher, Duke (ACS-1 [78])
- Mike Devine, NC State (ACS-1 [78])
- Jimmy Ness, Clemson (ACS-1 [71])

=== Special teams ===
==== Kickers ====
- Steve Mike-Mayer, Maryland (ACS-1 [105])

==== Return specialist ====
- Troy Slade, Duke (ACS-1 [69])

== Key ==
ACS = Atlantic Coast Sports Writers Association

== See also ==
- 1974 College Football All-America Team
