= 1974 East Carolina Pirates football team =

American college football season

1974 East Carolina Pirates football
- Conference: Southern Conference
- Record: 7–4 (3–3 SoCon)
- Head coach: Pat Dye (1st season)
- Home stadium: Ficklen Memorial Stadium

1974 Southern Conference football standings
	Conf.					Overall
Team	W		L		T	W		L		T
VMI $	5	–	1	–	0	7	–	4	–	0
Appalachian State	4	–	1	–	0	6	–	5	–	0
East Carolina	3	–	3	–	0	7	–	4	–	0
Richmond	3	–	3	–	0	5	–	5	–	0
The Citadel	3	–	4	–	0	4	–	7	–	0
William & Mary	2	–	3	–	0	4	–	7	–	0
Furman	2	–	4	–	0	5	–	6	–	0
Davidson	0	–	3	–	0	2	–	7	–	0
$ – Conference champion

The 1974 East Carolina Pirates football team was an American football team that represented East Carolina University as a member of the Southern Conference during the 1974 NCAA Division I football season. In their first season under head coach Pat Dye, the team compiled a 7–4 record.

== Schedule ==
Date	Opponent	Site	Result	Attendance	Source
September 14	Bowling Green*	Ficklen Memorial Stadium; Greenville, NC	W 24–6	16,500	
September 21	East Tennessee State*	Ficklen Memorial Stadium; Greenville, NC	W 24–8	16,226	
September 28	Southern Illinois*	Ficklen Memorial Stadium; Greenville, NC	W 17–16	15,525	
October 5	at No. 8 NC State*	Carter Stadium; Raleigh, NC (rivalry)	L 20–24	42,800	
October 12	at Furman	Sirrine Stadium; Greenville, SC	W 15–12	16,800	
October 19	at Appalachian State	Conrad Stadium; Boone, NC	L 21–23	11,259	
October 26	Dayton*	Ficklen Memorial Stadium; Greenville, NC	W 34–6	14,674	
November 2	The Citadel	Ficklen Memorial Stadium; Greenville, NC	W 41–21	19,450	
November 9	at Richmond	City Stadium; Richmond, VA	L 20–28	14,000	
November 16	at William & Mary	Cary Field; Williamsburg, VA	W 31–10	8,500	
November 23	at VMI	Alumni Memorial Field; Lexington, VA	L 3–13	8,100	
*Non-conference game; Rankings from Coaches' Poll released prior to the game
