= 1974 VMI Keydets football team =

American college football season

1974 VMI Keydets football

SoCon champion
- Conference: Southern Conference
- Record: 7–4 (5–1 SoCon)
- Head coach: Bob Thalman (4th season)
- Home stadium: Alumni Memorial Field

1974 Southern Conference football standings
	Conf.					Overall
Team	W		L		T	W		L		T
VMI $	5	–	1	–	0	7	–	4	–	0
Appalachian State	4	–	1	–	0	6	–	5	–	0
East Carolina	3	–	3	–	0	7	–	4	–	0
Richmond	3	–	3	–	0	5	–	5	–	0
The Citadel	3	–	4	–	0	4	–	7	–	0
William & Mary	2	–	3	–	0	4	–	7	–	0
Furman	2	–	4	–	0	5	–	6	–	0
Davidson	0	–	3	–	0	2	–	7	–	0
$ – Conference champion

The 1974 VMI Keydets football team was an American football team that represented the Virginia Military Institute (VMI) as a member of the Southern Conference (SoCon) during the 1974 NCAA Division I football season. In their fourth year under head coach Bob Thalman, the team compiled an overall record of 7–4 with a mark of 5–1 in conference play, and finishing as SoCon champion.

== Schedule ==
Date	Opponent	Site	Result	Attendance	Source
September 14	Furman	Alumni Memorial Field; Lexington, VA	W 7–0	5,800	
September 21	at Vanderbilt*	Dudley Field; Nashville, TN	L 7–45	16,500	
September 28	at Davidson	Richardson Stadium; Davidson, NC	W 43–7	4,500	
October 5	vs. Virginia Tech*	City Stadium; Richmond, VA	W 22–17	22,000	
October 12	at The Citadel	Johnson Hagood Stadium; Charleston, SC	W 20–9	12,800	
October 19	at Southern Miss*	Ladd Stadium; Mobile, AL	L 14–15	5,074	
October 26	William & Mary	Alumni Memorial Field; Lexington, VA	W 31–20	8,800	
November 2	at Richmond	City Stadium; Richmond, VA	L 14–17	15,000	
November 9	at Virginia*	Scott Stadium; Charlottesville, VA	L 10–28	26,030	
November 16	Colgate*	Alumni Memorial Field; Lexington, VA	W 31–14	4,600	
November 23	East Carolina	Alumni Memorial Field; Lexington, VA	W 13–3	8,100	
*Non-conference game
