= 1974 Middle Tennessee Blue Raiders football team =

American college football season

1974 Middle Tennessee Blue Raiders football
- Conference: Ohio Valley Conference
- Record: 3–8 (2–5 OVC)
- Head coach: Bill Peck (5th season)
- Captains: Orsillo; Flippin; Rohrdanz
- Home stadium: Horace Jones Field

1974 Ohio Valley Conference football standings
	Conf.					Overall
Team	W		L		T	W		L		T
Eastern Kentucky $	6	–	1	–	0	8	–	2	–	0
Murray State	5	–	2	–	0	9	–	2	–	0
Western Kentucky	5	–	2	–	0	7	–	3	–	0
Tennessee Tech	4	–	3	–	0	6	–	5	–	0
East Tennessee State	3	–	3	–	1	4	–	6	–	1
Middle Tennessee	2	–	5	–	0	3	–	8	–	0
Austin Peay	1	–	5	–	1	3	–	7	–	1
Morehead State	1	–	6	–	0	3	–	8	–	0
$ – Conference champion

The 1974 Middle Tennessee Blue Raiders football team represented Middle Tennessee State University—as a member of the Ohio Valley Conference (OVC) during the 1974 NCAA Division II football season. Led by fifth-year head coach Bill Peck, the Blue Raiders compiled a record an overall record of 3–8 with a mark of 2–5 in conference play, placing sixth in the OVC. The team's captains were Orsillo, Flippin, and Rohrdanz.

== Schedule ==
Date	Opponent	Site	Result	Attendance	Source
September 7	vs. Tennessee State*	Dudley Field; Nashville, TN	W 20–10	14,000–17,000	
September 14	at Appalachian State*	Conrad Stadium; Boone, NC	L 7–18	7,200	
September 28	Morehead State	Horace Jones Field; Murfreesboro, TN	W 23–14	10,000	
October 5	Chattanooga*	Horace Jones Field; Murfreesboro, TN	L 7–24	10,000	
October 12	at Eastern Kentucky	Hanger Field; Richmond, KY	L 17–21	7,400	
October 19	at Murray State	Roy Stewart Stadium; Murray, KY	L 12–14	15,000	
October 26	Austin Peay	Horace Jones Field; Murfreesboro, TN	W 45–16	12,000	
November 2	Ball State*	Horace Jones Field; Murfreesboro, TN	L 14–43	3,800	
November 9	at No. 7 Western Kentucky	L. T. Smith Stadium; Bowling Green, KY (rivalry)	L 10–36	13,300	
November 16	East Tennessee State	Horace Jones Field; Murfreesboro, TN	L 7–17	3,300	
November 23	at Tennessee Tech	Tucker Stadium; Cookeville, TN	L 2–41	8,500	
*Non-conference game; Rankings from AP Poll released prior to the game

== After the season ==
=== NFL draft ===
The following Blue Raider was selected in the 1975 NFL draft following the season.

Round	Pick	Player	Position	NFL club
17	439	Dwaine Copeland	Running back	Miami Dolphins
