= 1974 Western Kentucky Hilltoppers football team =

American college football season

1974 Western Kentucky Hilltoppers football
- Conference: Ohio Valley Conference
- Record: 7–3 (5–2 OVC)
- Head coach: Jimmy Feix (7th season)
- Home stadium: L. T. Smith Stadium

1974 Ohio Valley Conference football standings
	Conf.					Overall
Team	W		L		T	W		L		T
Eastern Kentucky $	6	–	1	–	0	8	–	2	–	0
Murray State	5	–	2	–	0	9	–	2	–	0
Western Kentucky	5	–	2	–	0	7	–	3	–	0
Tennessee Tech	4	–	3	–	0	6	–	5	–	0
East Tennessee State	3	–	3	–	1	4	–	6	–	1
Middle Tennessee	2	–	5	–	0	3	–	8	–	0
Austin Peay	1	–	5	–	1	3	–	7	–	1
Morehead State	1	–	6	–	0	3	–	8	–	0
$ – Conference champion

The 1974 Western Kentucky football team represented Western Kentucky University during the 1974 NCAA Division II football season. Coming off a 12-1 and NCAA Playoff Runners-up season the previous year, WKU started the season ranked number 1 in both the AP and UPI national polls. They ended up losing their last two games, finished tied for 2nd in the conference, and missed the NCAA Playoffs. The team's roster included future National Football League (NFL) players Virgil Livers, John Bushong, David Carter, Rick Caswell, and Biff Madon. Livers and Bushong were named to the AP All-American team, and Livers was also named OVC Defensive Player of the Year. The All OVC team included Livers, Bushong, Rick Green, David Carter, John Humphrey, and Keith Tandy. The coaching staff included future NFL coach Romeo Crennel.

== Schedule ==
Date	Opponent	Rank	Site	Result	Attendance	Source
September 14	C.W. Post*	No. 1	L. T. Smith Stadium; Bowling Green, KY	W 48–0	13,300	
September 28	Austin Peay	No. 2	L. T. Smith Stadium; Bowling Green, KY	W 35–7	13,400	
October 5	East Tennessee State	No. 2	Memorial Stadium; Johnson City, TN	W 24–0	5,213	
October 12	Dayton*^{†}	No. 3	L. T. Smith Stadium; Bowling Green, KY	W 32–15	20,000	
October 19	at Tennessee Tech	No. 2	Tucker Stadium; Cookeville, TN	L 6–10	12,000	
October 26	No. 15 Eastern Kentucky	No. 7	L. T. Smith Stadium; Bowling Green, KY (Battle of the Bluegrass)	W 34–24	18,880	
November 2	at Morehead State	No. 7	Jayne Stadium; Morehead, KY	W 36–0	8,000	
November 9	Middle Tennessee	No. 7	L. T. Smith Stadium; Bowling Green, KY (100 Miles of Hate)	W 36–10	13,300	
November 16	No. 11 Western Carolina*	No. 8	L. T. Smith Stadium; Bowling Green, KY	L 2–20	11,300	
November 23	at Murray State	No. 13	Roy Stewart Stadium; Murray, KY (Battle for the Red Belt)	L 7–9	15,200	
*Non-conference game; ^{†}Homecoming; Rankings from AP Poll released prior to the game
