= Harry Walters (Canadian football) =

American gridiron football player (born 1952)

Profile
- Position: Linebacker

Personal information
- Born: July 21, 1952 (age 74)
- Listed height: 6 ft 1 in (1.85 m)
- Listed weight: 220 lb (100 kg)

Career information
- College: Maryland
- NFL draft: 1975: 12th round, 303rd overall pick

Career history
- 1975–1978: Winnipeg Blue Bombers
- 1979: Hamilton Tiger-Cats
- 1980: Edmonton Eskimos

Awards and highlights
- CFL West All-Star (1975, 1976); First-team All-ACC (1974)

Harry Walters (born July 21, 1952) is a Canadian football player who played professionally for the Winnipeg Blue Bombers, Hamilton Tiger-Cats and Edmonton Eskimos.
