= 1982 NC State Wolfpack football team =

American college football season

1982 NC State Wolfpack football
- Conference: Atlantic Coast Conference
- Record: 6–5 (3–3 ACC)
- Head coach: Monte Kiffin (3rd season)
- Home stadium: Carter Stadium

1982 Atlantic Coast Conference football standings
	Conf.					Overall
Team	W		L		T	W		L		T
No. 8 Clemson $	6	–	0	–	0	9	–	1	–	1
No. 20 Maryland	5	–	1	–	0	8	–	4	–	0
No. 18 North Carolina	3	–	3	–	0	8	–	4	–	0
Duke	3	–	3	–	0	6	–	5	–	0
NC State	3	–	3	–	0	6	–	5	–	0
Virginia	1	–	5	–	0	2	–	9	–	0
Wake Forest	0	–	6	–	0	3	–	8	–	0
$ – Conference champion; Rankings from AP Poll

The 1982 NC State Wolfpack football team represented North Carolina State University during the 1982 NCAA Division I-A football season. The team's head coach was Monte Kiffin. NC State has been a member of the Atlantic Coast Conference (ACC) since the league's inception in 1953. The Wolfpack played its home games in 1982 at Carter–Finley Stadium in Raleigh, North Carolina, which has been NC State football's home stadium since 1966.

== Schedule ==
Date	Time	Opponent	Site	Result	Attendance	Source
September 4		Furman*	Carter–Finley Stadium; Raleigh, NC	W 26–0	41,300	
September 11		East Carolina*	Carter–Finley Stadium; Raleigh, NC (rivalry)	W 33–26	55,200	
September 18		Wake Forest	Carter–Finley Stadium; Raleigh, NC (rivalry)	W 30–0	44,800	
September 25		at Maryland	Byrd Stadium; College Park, MD	L 6–23	34,300	
October 2		at Virginia	Scott Stadium; Charlottesville, VA	W 16–13	23,747	
October 16		at No. 11 North Carolina	Kenan Memorial Stadium; Chapel Hill, NC (rivalry)	L 9–41	53,278	
October 23		No. 18 Clemson	Carter–Finley Stadium; Raleigh, NC (Textile Bowl)	L 29–38	47,300	
October 30		South Carolina*	Carter–Finley Stadium; Raleigh, NC	W 33–3	42,300	
November 6		at No. 7 Penn State*	Beaver Stadium; University Park, PA	L 0–54	84,837	
November 13		Duke	Carter–Finley Stadium; Raleigh, NC (rivalry)	W 21–16	42,800	
November 20	2:00 p.m.	at Miami (FL)*	Miami Orange Bowl; Miami, FL	L 3–41	20,434	
*Non-conference game; Rankings from AP Poll released prior to the game; All times are in Eastern time
