= 1982 Virginia Cavaliers football team =

American college football season

1982 Virginia Cavaliers football
- Conference: Atlantic Coast Conference
- Record: 2–9 (1–5 ACC)
- Head coach: George Welsh (1st season)
- Captains: Pat Chester; Kevin Riccio
- Home stadium: Scott Stadium

1982 Atlantic Coast Conference football standings
	Conf.					Overall
Team	W		L		T	W		L		T
No. 8 Clemson $	6	–	0	–	0	9	–	1	–	1
No. 20 Maryland	5	–	1	–	0	8	–	4	–	0
No. 18 North Carolina	3	–	3	–	0	8	–	4	–	0
Duke	3	–	3	–	0	6	–	5	–	0
NC State	3	–	3	–	0	6	–	5	–	0
Virginia	1	–	5	–	0	2	–	9	–	0
Wake Forest	0	–	6	–	0	3	–	8	–	0
$ – Conference champion; Rankings from AP Poll

The 1982 Virginia Cavaliers football team represented the University of Virginia during the 1982 NCAA Division I-A football season. The Cavaliers were led by first-year head coach George Welsh and played their home games at Scott Stadium in Charlottesville, Virginia. They competed as members of the Atlantic Coast Conference, finishing in sixth.

== Schedule ==
Date	Time	Opponent	Site	TV	Result	Attendance	Source
September 11	3:50 p.m.	at Navy*	Navy–Marine Corps Memorial Stadium; Annapolis, MD	ABC	L 16–30	26,017	
September 18	1:30 p.m.	James Madison*	Scott Stadium; Charlottesville, VA		L 17–21	23,524	
September 25	1:30 p.m.	at Duke	Wallace Wade Stadium; Durham, NC		L 17–51	21,725	
October 2	1:30 p.m.	NC State	Scott Stadium; Charlottesville, VA		L 13–16	23,747	
October 9	8:00 p.m.	Clemson	Scott Stadium; Charlottesville, VA	TBS	L 0–48	30,971	
October 23	1:30 p.m.	Wake Forest^{†}	Scott Stadium; Charlottesville, VA		W 34–27	24,105	
October 30	1:30 p.m.	VMI*	Scott Stadium; Charlottesville, VA		W 37–6	29,456	
November 6	1:30 p.m.	at Georgia Tech*	Grant Field; Atlanta, GA		L 32–38	22,103	
November 13	1:00 p.m.	at North Carolina	Kenan Memorial Stadium; Chapel Hill, NC (South's Oldest Rivalry)		L 14–27	49,500	
November 20	1:30 p.m.	No. 19 Maryland	Scott Stadium; Charlottesville, VA (rivalry)		L 14–45	20,002	
November 25	8:15 p.m.	at Virginia Tech*	Lane Stadium; Blacksburg, VA (rivalry)	TBS	L 14–21	23,800	
*Non-conference game; ^{†}Homecoming; Rankings from AP Poll released prior to the game
