= 1974 Wake Forest Demon Deacons football team =

American college football season

1974 Wake Forest Demon Deacons football
- Conference: Atlantic Coast Conference
- Record: 1–10 (0–6 ACC)
- Head coach: Chuck Mills (2nd season)
- Captains: Mike Arthur; Keith Carter; Dave Mebs
- Home stadium: Groves Stadium

1974 Atlantic Coast Conference football standings
| | Conf. | | | | | Overall |
| Team | W | | L | | T | W | | L | | T |
|---|---|---|---|---|---|---|---|---|---|---|
| No. 13 Maryland $ | 6 | – | 0 | – | 0 | 8 | – | 4 | – | 0 |
| No. 11 NC State | 4 | – | 2 | – | 0 | 9 | – | 2 | – | 1 |
| Clemson | 4 | – | 2 | – | 0 | 7 | – | 4 | – | 0 |
| North Carolina | 4 | – | 2 | – | 0 | 7 | – | 5 | – | 0 |
| Duke | 2 | – | 4 | – | 0 | 6 | – | 5 | – | 0 |
| Virginia | 1 | – | 5 | – | 0 | 4 | – | 7 | – | 0 |
| Wake Forest | 0 | – | 6 | – | 0 | 1 | – | 10 | – | 0 |
$ – Conference champion; Rankings from AP Poll

The 1974 Wake Forest Demon Deacons football team was an American football team that represented Wake Forest University during the 1974 NCAA Division I football season. In their second season under head coach Chuck Mills, the Demon Deacons compiled a 1–10 record and finished in last place in the Atlantic Coast Conference.

== Schedule ==
| Date | Opponent | Site | Result | Attendance | Source |
|---|---|---|---|---|---|
| September 7 | No. 18 NC State | Groves Stadium; Winston-Salem, NC (rivalry) | L 15–33 | 22,500 | |
| September 14 | William & Mary* | Groves Stadium; Winston-Salem, NC | L 6–17 | 11,800 | |
| September 21 | North Carolina | Groves Stadium; Winston-Salem, NC (rivalry) | L 0–31 | 27,200 | |
| October 5 | at No. 2 Oklahoma* | Oklahoma Memorial Stadium; Norman, OK | L 0–63 | 61,826 | |
| October 12 | at No. 15 Penn State* | Beaver Stadium; University Park, PA | L 0–55 | 56,500 | |
| October 19 | at No. 18 Maryland | Byrd Stadium; College Park, MD | L 0–47 | 31,136 | |
| October 26 | Virginia | Groves Stadium; Winston-Salem, NC | L 0–14 | 13,700 | |
| November 2 | Clemson | Groves Stadium; Winston-Salem, NC | L 9–21 | 13,200 | |
| November 9 | at Duke | Wallace Wade Stadium; Durham, NC (rivalry) | L 7–23 | 18,200 | |
| November 16 | at South Carolina* | Williams–Brice Stadium; Columbia, SC | L 21–34 | 27,677 | |
| November 23 | Furman* | Groves Stadium; Winston-Salem, NC | W 16–10 | 7,800 | |
*Non-conference game; Rankings from AP Poll released prior to the game

== Team leaders ==
| Category | Team Leader | Att/Cth | Yds |
|---|---|---|---|
| Passing | Mike McGlamrey | 50/115 | 585 |
| Rushing | Clark Gaines | 98 | 329 |
| Receiving | Tom Fehring | 17 | 234 |
