= 1974 Appalachian State Mountaineers football team =

American college football season

1974 Appalachian State Mountaineers football
- Conference: Southern Conference
- Record: 6–5 (4–1 SoCon)
- Head coach: Jim Brakefield (4th season)
- Home stadium: Conrad Stadium

1974 Southern Conference football standings
	Conf.					Overall
Team	W		L		T	W		L		T
VMI $	5	–	1	–	0	7	–	4	–	0
Appalachian State	4	–	1	–	0	6	–	5	–	0
East Carolina	3	–	3	–	0	7	–	4	–	0
Richmond	3	–	3	–	0	5	–	5	–	0
The Citadel	3	–	4	–	0	4	–	7	–	0
William & Mary	2	–	3	–	0	4	–	7	–	0
Furman	2	–	4	–	0	5	–	6	–	0
Davidson	0	–	3	–	0	2	–	7	–	0
$ – Conference champion

The 1974 Appalachian State Mountaineers football team was an American football team that represented Appalachian State University as a member of the Southern Conference (SoCon) during the 1974 NCAA Division I football season. In their fourth year under head coach Jim Brakefield, the Mountaineers compiled an overall record of 6–5 with a mark of 4–1 in conference play, and finished second in the SoCon.

== Schedule ==
Date	Opponent	Site	Result	Attendance	Source
September 7	East Tennessee State*	Conrad Stadium; Boone, NC	W 16–7	8,500	
September 14	Middle Tennessee*	Conrad Stadium; Boone, NC	W 18–7	9,500	
September 21	at Davidson	Richardson Stadium; Davidson, NC	W 30–0	7,600	
September 28	Western Carolina*	Conrad Stadium; Boone, NC (rivalry)	L 17–21	13,589	
October 5	at Tennessee Tech*	Tucker Stadium; Cookeville, TN	L 14–24	7,000	
October 12	at Lenoir Rhyne*	Moretz Stadium; Hickory, NC	L 10–31	10,500	
October 19	East Carolina	Conrad Stadium; Boone, NC	W 23–21	11,259	
October 26	at The Citadel	Johnson Hagood Stadium; Charleston, SC	L 17–28	13,235	
November 2	Furman	Conrad Stadium; Boone, NC	W 27–3	12,291	
November 9	at South Carolina*	Williams–Brice Stadium; Columbia, SC	L 18–21	32,285	
November 16	at Richmond	City Stadium; Richmond, VA	W 14–13	10,000	
*Non-conference game
