= 1974 Virginia Cavaliers football team =

American college football season

1974 Virginia Cavaliers football
- Conference: Atlantic Coast Conference
- Record: 4–7 (1–5 ACC)
- Head coach: Sonny Randle (1st season)
- Defensive coordinator: Carl Reese (1st season)
- Captain: Dick Ambrose
- Home stadium: Scott Stadium

1974 Atlantic Coast Conference football standings
	Conf.					Overall
Team	W		L		T	W		L		T
No. 13 Maryland $	6	–	0	–	0	8	–	4	–	0
No. 11 NC State	4	–	2	–	0	9	–	2	–	1
Clemson	4	–	2	–	0	7	–	4	–	0
North Carolina	4	–	2	–	0	7	–	5	–	0
Duke	2	–	4	–	0	6	–	5	–	0
Virginia	1	–	5	–	0	4	–	7	–	0
Wake Forest	0	–	6	–	0	1	–	10	–	0
$ – Conference champion; Rankings from AP Poll

The 1974 Virginia Cavaliers football team represented the University of Virginia during the 1974 NCAA Division I football season. The Cavaliers were led by first-year head coach Sonny Randle and played their home games at Scott Stadium in Charlottesville, Virginia. They competed as members of the Atlantic Coast Conference, finishing in sixth.

== Schedule ==
Date	Opponent	Site	Result	Attendance	Source
September 14	at Navy*	Navy–Marine Corps Memorial Stadium; Annapolis, MD	L 28–35	16,987	
September 21	William & Mary*	Scott Stadium; Charlottesville, VA	W 38–28	26,000	
September 28	at Duke	Wallace Wade Stadium; Durham, NC	L 7–27	18,250	
October 5	at Georgia Tech*	Grant Field; Atlanta, GA	L 24–28	26,371	
October 12	No. 11 NC State^{†}	Scott Stadium; Charlottesville, VA	L 21–22	27,100	
October 19	Virginia Tech*	Scott Stadium; Charlottesville, VA (rivalry)	W 28–27	32,149	
October 26	at Wake Forest	Groves Stadium; Winston-Salem, NC	W 14–0	13,700	
November 2	at North Carolina	Kenan Memorial Stadium; Chapel Hill, NC (South's Oldest Rivalry)	L 10–24	38,500	
November 9	VMI*	Scott Stadium; Charlottesville, VA	W 28–10	26,030	
November 16	at Clemson	Memorial Stadium; Clemson, SC	L 9–28	32,656	
November 23	No. 11 Maryland	Scott Stadium; Charlottesville, VA (rivalry)	L 0–10	22,100	
*Non-conference game; ^{†}Homecoming; Rankings from AP Poll released prior to the game

== Personnel ==
1974 Virginia Cavaliers football team roster
Players			Coaches
Offense: Pos. / # / Name / Class; QB / / Scott Gardner / Jr	Defense: Pos. / # / Name / Class	Special teams: Pos. / # / Name / Class	Head coach: Sonny Randle; Coordinators/assistant coaches Legend: (C) Team captain; (S) Suspended; (I) Ineligible; Injured; Redshirt
