= 1982 Wake Forest Demon Deacons football team =

American college football season

1982 Wake Forest Demon Deacons football
- Conference: Atlantic Coast Conference
- Record: 3–8 (2–4 ACC)
- Head coach: Al Groh (2nd season)
- Offensive coordinator: Ed Zaunbrecher (3rd season)
- Captain: Game captains
- Home stadium: Groves Stadium

1982 Atlantic Coast Conference football standings
	Conf.					Overall
Team	W		L		T	W		L		T
No. 8 Clemson $	6	–	0	–	0	9	–	1	–	1
No. 20 Maryland	5	–	1	–	0	8	–	4	–	0
No. 18 North Carolina	3	–	3	–	0	8	–	4	–	0
Duke	3	–	3	–	0	6	–	5	–	0
NC State	3	–	3	–	0	6	–	5	–	0
Virginia	1	–	5	–	0	2	–	9	–	0
Wake Forest	0	–	6	–	0	3	–	8	–	0
$ – Conference champion; Rankings from AP Poll

The 1982 Wake Forest Demon Deacons football team was an American football team that represented Wake Forest University during the 1982 NCAA Division I-A football season. In their second season under head coach Al Groh, the Demon Deacons compiled a 3–8 record and finished in last place in the Atlantic Coast Conference.

== Schedule ==
Date	Opponent	Site	Result	Attendance	Source
September 4	Western Carolina*	Groves Stadium; Winston-Salem, NC	W 31–10	25,476	
September 11	at Auburn*	Jordan-Hare Stadium; Auburn, AL	L 10–28	59,350	
September 18	at NC State	Carter–Finley Stadium; Raleigh, NC (rivalry)	L 0–30	44,800	
September 25	Appalachian State*	Groves Stadium; Winston-Salem, NC	W 31–22	29,100	
October 2	at Virginia Tech*	Lane Stadium; Blacksburg, VA	W 13–10	37,300	
October 9	No. 12 North Carolina	Groves Stadium; Winston-Salem, NC (rivalry)	L 7–24	36,200	
October 16	at Maryland	Byrd Stadium; College Park, MD	L 31–52	35,100	
October 23	at Virginia	Scott Stadium; Charlottesville, VA	L 27–34	24,105	
November 6	at Duke	Wallace Wade Stadium; Durham, NC (rivalry)	L 28–46	21,500	
November 13	Georgia Tech*	Groves Stadium; Winston-Salem, NC	L 7–45	19,257	
November 27	vs. No. 10 Clemson	National Stadium; Tokyo, Japan (Mirage Bowl)	L 17–21	80,000	
*Non-conference game; Rankings from AP Poll released prior to the game

== Team leaders ==
Category	Team Leader	Att/Cth	Yds
Passing	Gary Schofield	212/376	2,380
Rushing	Michael Ramseur	245	966
Receiving	Phil Denfeld	42	424
