= 1974 William & Mary Indians football team =

American college football season

1974 William & Mary Indians football
- Conference: Southern Conference
- Record: 4–7 (2–3 SoCon)
- Head coach: Jim Root (3rd season)
- Defensive coordinator: Lou Tepper (3rd season)
- Captains: Mike Stewart; Dick Pawlewicz
- Home stadium: Cary Field

1974 Southern Conference football standings
	Conf.					Overall
Team	W		L		T	W		L		T
VMI $	5	–	1	–	0	7	–	4	–	0
Appalachian State	4	–	1	–	0	6	–	5	–	0
East Carolina	3	–	3	–	0	7	–	4	–	0
Richmond	3	–	3	–	0	5	–	5	–	0
The Citadel	3	–	4	–	0	4	–	7	–	0
William & Mary	2	–	3	–	0	4	–	7	–	0
Furman	2	–	4	–	0	5	–	6	–	0
Davidson	0	–	3	–	0	2	–	7	–	0
$ – Conference champion

The 1974 William & Mary Indians football team represented the College of William & Mary as a member of the Southern Conference (SoCon) during the 1974 NCAA Division I football season. Led by Jim Root in his third year as head coach, William & Mary finished the season 4–7 overall and 2–3 in SoCon play to place sixth.

== Schedule ==
Date	Opponent	Site	Result	Attendance	Source
September 7	at Mississippi State*	Scott Field; Starkville, MS	L 7–49	8,108	
September 14	at Wake Forest*	Groves Stadium; Winston-Salem, NC	W 17–6	11,800	
September 21	at Virginia*	Scott Stadium; Charlottesville, VA	L 28–38	26,000	
September 28	at Furman	Sirrine Stadium; Greenville, SC	L 0–10	12,000	
October 5	The Citadel	Cary Field; Williamsburg, VA	W 16–12	10,000	
October 12	at Boston College*	Alumni Stadium; Chestnut Hill, MA	L 16–31	18,360	
October 19	Rutgers*	Cary Field; Williamsburg, VA	W 28–15	13,000	
October 26	at VMI	Alumni Memorial Field; Lexington, VA (rivalry)	L 20–31	8,800	
November 9	Virginia Tech*	Cary Field; Williamsburg, VA	L 15–34	15,000	
November 16	East Carolina	Cary Field; Williamsburg, VA	L 10–31	8,500	
November 23	at Richmond	City Stadium; Richmond, VA (rivalry)	W 54–12	10,000	
*Non-conference game
