= 1974 Maryland Terrapins football team =

American college football season

1974 Maryland Terrapins football

ACC champion

Liberty Bowl, L 3–7 vs. Tennessee
- Conference: Atlantic Coast Conference

Ranking
- Coaches: No. 13
- AP: No. 13
- Record: 8–4 (6–0 ACC)
- Head coach: Jerry Claiborne (3rd season)
- Home stadium: Byrd Stadium

1974 Atlantic Coast Conference football standings
	Conf.					Overall
Team	W		L		T	W		L		T
No. 13 Maryland $	6	–	0	–	0	8	–	4	–	0
No. 11 NC State	4	–	2	–	0	9	–	2	–	1
Clemson	4	–	2	–	0	7	–	4	–	0
North Carolina	4	–	2	–	0	7	–	5	–	0
Duke	2	–	4	–	0	6	–	5	–	0
Virginia	1	–	5	–	0	4	–	7	–	0
Wake Forest	0	–	6	–	0	1	–	10	–	0
$ – Conference champion; Rankings from AP Poll

The 1974 Maryland Terrapins football team represented University of Maryland in the 1974 NCAA Division I football season. The Terrapins offense scored 316 points while the defense allowed 104 points. Led by head coach Jerry Claiborne, the Terrapins appeared in the Liberty Bowl.

== Schedule ==
Date	Opponent	Rank	Site	TV	Result	Attendance	Source
September 14	No. 3 Alabama*	No. 14	Byrd Stadium; College Park, MD		L 16–21	54,412	
September 21	vs. Florida*	No. 14	Tampa Stadium; Tampa, FL		L 10–17	41,140	
September 28	North Carolina		Byrd Stadium; College Park, MD		W 24–12	17,800	
October 5	at Syracuse*		Archbold Stadium; Syracuse, NY		W 31–0	19,130	
October 12	Clemson		Byrd Stadium; College Park, MD		W 41–0	32,644	
October 19	Wake Forest^{†}	No. 18	Byrd Stadium; College Park, MD		W 47–0	31,136	
October 26	No. 17 NC State	No. 15	Byrd Stadium; College Park, MD		W 20–10	49,674	
November 2	at No. 10 Penn State*	No. 15	Beaver Stadium; University Park, PA (rivalry)	ABC	L 17–24	60,125	
November 9	Villanova*	No. 14	Byrd Stadium; College Park, MD		W 41–0	42,331	
November 16	vs. Duke	No. 13	Foreman Field; Norfolk, VA (Oyster Bowl)		W 56–13	24,000	
November 23	at Virginia	No. 11	Scott Stadium; Charlottesville, VA (rivalry)		W 10–0	22,100	
December 16	vs. No. 20 Tennessee*	No. 10	Memphis Memorial Stadium; Memphis, TN (Liberty Bowl)	ABC	L 3–7	51,284	
*Non-conference game; ^{†}Homecoming; Rankings from AP Poll released prior to the game

== Roster ==
1974 Maryland Terrapins football team roster
Players
Coaches
Offense

Pos.	#	Name	Class
QB	17	Bob Avellini	Sr
RB	32	Louis Carter	Sr
RB	25	Rick Jennings	Jr
WR		Vince Kinney	Fr

Defense

Pos.	#	Name	Class
DE	79	Joe Campbell	So
DB	46	Ken Schroy	Sr
DE	94	Randy White	Sr

Special teams

Pos.	#	Name	Class
K	1	Steve Mike-Mayer	Sr

Head coach

- Jerry Claiborne

Coordinators/assistant coaches

Legend

- (C) Team captain
- (S) Suspended
- (I) Ineligible
- Injured
- Redshirt

== NFL draft ==
Eleven Terrapins were selected in the 1975 NFL draft, which had 17 rounds and 442 selections.

Player	Position	Round	Overall	NFL team
Randy White	Defensive tackle	1	2	Dallas Cowboys
Steve Mike-Mayer	Kicker	3	72	San Francisco 49ers
Louis Carter	Running back	3	76	Oakland Raiders
Walter White	Tight end	3	78	Pittsburgh Steelers
Stan Rogers	Tackle	5	107	Denver Broncos
Bob Avellini	Quarterback	6	135	Chicago Bears
Phil Waganheim	Punter	10	236	Baltimore Colts
Ken Schroy	Defensive back	10	248	Philadelphia Eagles
Harry Walters	Linebacker	12	303	Denver Broncos
Robert Smith	Defensive back	16	416	Baltimore Colts
Frank Russell	Wide receiver	17	440	Baltimore Colts

== Awards and honors ==
- Randy White: Lombardi Award, Outland Trophy
