= 1982 Duke Blue Devils football team =

American college football season

1982 Duke Blue Devils football
- Conference: Atlantic Coast Conference
- Record: 6–5 (3–3 ACC)
- Head coach: Shirley Wilson (4th season)
- Offensive coordinator: Steve Spurrier (3rd season)
- Offensive scheme: Air Ball
- Defensive coordinator: Dick Hopkins (2nd season)
- Base defense: 4–3
- MVP: Chris Castor
- Captains: Robert Oxendine; Emmett Tilley
- Home stadium: Wallace Wade Stadium

1982 Atlantic Coast Conference football standings
	Conf.					Overall
Team	W		L		T	W		L		T
No. 8 Clemson $	6	–	0	–	0	9	–	1	–	1
No. 20 Maryland	5	–	1	–	0	8	–	4	–	0
No. 18 North Carolina	3	–	3	–	0	8	–	4	–	0
Duke	3	–	3	–	0	6	–	5	–	0
NC State	3	–	3	–	0	6	–	5	–	0
Virginia	1	–	5	–	0	2	–	9	–	0
Wake Forest	0	–	6	–	0	3	–	8	–	0
$ – Conference champion; Rankings from AP Poll

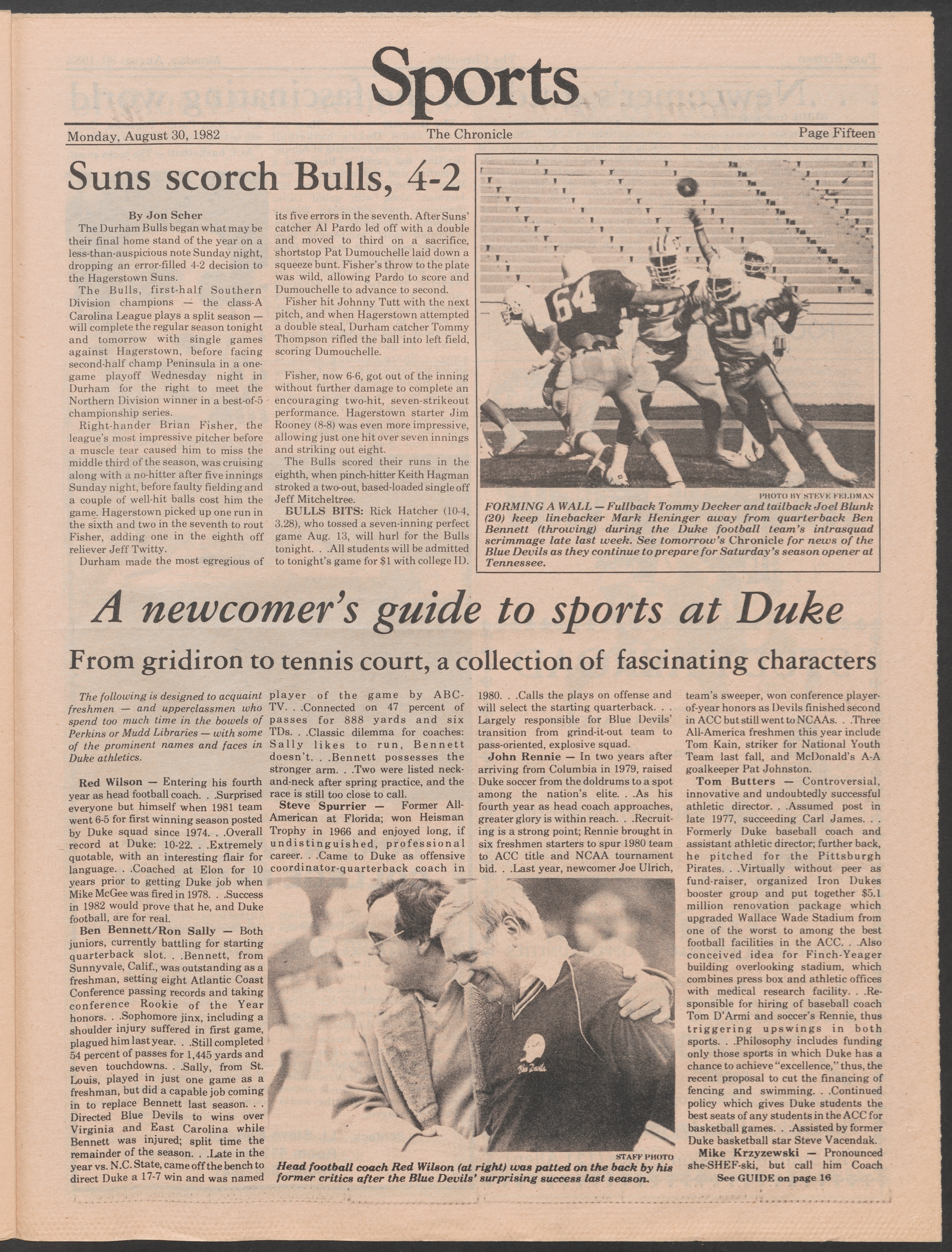
A page from The Chronicle, the student newspaper of Duke University, 1982

The 1982 Duke Blue Devils football team was an American football team that represented Duke University as a member of the Atlantic Coast Conference (ACC) during the 1982 NCAA Division I-A football season. In their fourth year under head coach Shirley Wilson, the Blue Devils compiled an overall record of 6–5, with a conference record of 3–3, and finished tied for third in the ACC.

== Schedule ==
Date	Opponent	Site	Result	Attendance	Source
September 4	at Tennessee*	Neyland Stadium; Knoxville, TN	W 25–24	95,223	
September 18	at South Carolina*	Williams–Brice Stadium; Columbia, SC	W 30–17	66,928	
September 25	Virginia	Wallace Wade Stadium; Durham, NC	W 51–17	21,725	
October 2	Navy*	Wallace Wade Stadium; Durham, NC	L 21–27	32,750	
October 9	Virginia Tech*	Wallace Wade Stadium; Durham, NC	L 21–22	25,125	
October 16	at No. 20 Clemson	Memorial Stadium; Clemson, SC	L 14–49	63,500	
October 23	at Maryland	Byrd Stadium; College Park, MD	L 22–49	40,100	
October 30	at Georgia Tech*	Grant Field; Atlanta, GA	W 38–21	36,562	
November 6	Wake Forest^{†}	Wallace Wade Stadium; Durham, NC (rivalry)	W 46–26	21,500	
November 13	at NC State	Carter–Finley Stadium; Raleigh, NC (rivalry)	L 16–21	42,800	
November 20	North Carolina	Wallace Wade Stadium; Durham, NC (Victory Bell)	W 23–17	33,941	
*Non-conference game; ^{†}Homecoming; Rankings from AP Poll released prior to the game
