= 1974 Duke Blue Devils football team =

American college football season

1974 Duke Blue Devils football
- Conference: Atlantic Coast Conference
- Record: 6–5 (2–4 ACC)
- Head coach: Mike McGee (4th season)
- Defensive coordinator: Jerry McGee (3rd season)
- MVP: Keith Stoneback
- Captains: Mike Bomgardner; Keith Stoneback
- Home stadium: Wallace Wade Stadium

1974 Atlantic Coast Conference football standings
	Conf.					Overall
Team	W		L		T	W		L		T
No. 13 Maryland $	6	–	0	–	0	8	–	4	–	0
No. 11 NC State	4	–	2	–	0	9	–	2	–	1
Clemson	4	–	2	–	0	7	–	4	–	0
North Carolina	4	–	2	–	0	7	–	5	–	0
Duke	2	–	4	–	0	6	–	5	–	0
Virginia	1	–	5	–	0	4	–	7	–	0
Wake Forest	0	–	6	–	0	1	–	10	–	0
$ – Conference champion; Rankings from AP Poll

The 1974 Duke Blue Devils football team was an American football team that represented Duke University as a member of the Atlantic Coast Conference (ACC) during the 1974 NCAA Division I football season. In their fourth year under head coach Mike McGee, the Blue Devils compiled an overall record of 6–5, with a conference record of 2–4, and finished fifth in the ACC.

== Schedule ==
Date	Opponent	Site	Result	Attendance	Source
September 14	at No. 16 NC State	Carter Stadium; Raleigh, NC (rivalry)	L 21–35	42,200	
September 21	at South Carolina*	Williams–Brice Stadium; Columbia, SC	W 20–14	45,620	
September 28	Virginia	Wallace Wade Stadium; Durham, NC	W 27–7	18,250	
October 5	Purdue*	Wallace Wade Stadium; Durham, NC	W 16–14	20,500	
October 12	Army*^{†}	Wallace Wade Stadium; Durham, NC	W 33–14	28,500	
October 19	at Clemson	Memorial Stadium; Clemson, SC	L 13–17	42,354	
October 26	at No. 14 Florida*	Florida Field; Gainesville, FL	L 13–30	56,251	
November 2	Georgia Tech*	Wallace Wade Stadium; Durham, NC	W 9–0	34,500	
November 9	Wake Forest	Wallace Wade Stadium; Durham, NC (rivalry)	W 23–7	18,200	
November 16	vs. No. 13 Maryland	Foreman Field; Norfolk, VA (Oyster Bowl)	L 13–56	24,000	
November 23	at North Carolina	Kenan Stadium; Chapel Hill, NC (Victory Bell)	L 13–14	47,300	
*Non-conference game; ^{†}Homecoming; Rankings from AP Poll released prior to the game
