= 1974 The Citadel Bulldogs football team =

American college football season

1974 The Citadel Bulldogs football
- Conference: Southern Conference
- Record: 4–7 (3–4 SoCon)
- Head coach: Bobby Ross (2nd season)
- Home stadium: Johnson Hagood Stadium

1974 Southern Conference football standings
| | Conf. | | | | | Overall |
| Team | W | | L | | T | W | | L | | T |
|---|---|---|---|---|---|---|---|---|---|---|
| VMI $ | 5 | – | 1 | – | 0 | 7 | – | 4 | – | 0 |
| Appalachian State | 4 | – | 1 | – | 0 | 6 | – | 5 | – | 0 |
| East Carolina | 3 | – | 3 | – | 0 | 7 | – | 4 | – | 0 |
| Richmond | 3 | – | 3 | – | 0 | 5 | – | 5 | – | 0 |
| The Citadel | 3 | – | 4 | – | 0 | 4 | – | 7 | – | 0 |
| William & Mary | 2 | – | 3 | – | 0 | 4 | – | 7 | – | 0 |
| Furman | 2 | – | 4 | – | 0 | 5 | – | 6 | – | 0 |
| Davidson | 0 | – | 3 | – | 0 | 2 | – | 7 | – | 0 |
$ – Conference champion

The 1974 The Citadel Bulldogs football team represented The Citadel, The Military College of South Carolina in the 1974 NCAA Division I football season. Bobby Ross served as head coach for the second season. The Bulldogs played as members of the Southern Conference and played home games at Johnson Hagood Stadium.

== Schedule ==
| Date | Opponent | Site | Result | Attendance | Source |
|---|---|---|---|---|---|
| September 14 | Presbyterian* | Johnson Hagood Stadium; Charleston, SC | W 6–0 | 8,000 | |
| September 21 | at No. 4 (small) Delaware* | Delaware Stadium; Newark, DE | L 12–48 | 18,893 | |
| September 28 | Richmond | Johnson Hagood Stadium; Charleston, SC | L 24–27 | 7,485 | |
| October 5 | at William & Mary | Cary Field; Williamsburg, VA | L 12–16 | 10,000 | |
| October 12 | VMI | Johnson Hagood Stadium; Charleston, SC (rivalry) | L 9–20 | 12,800 | |
| October 19 | at No. 20 Tulane* | Tulane Stadium; New Orleans, LA | L 3–30 | 41,499 | |
| October 26 | Appalachian State | Johnson Hagood Stadium; Charleston, SC | W 28–17 | 13,235 | |
| November 2 | at East Carolina | Ficklen Stadium; Greenville, NC | L 21–41 | 19,450 | |
| November 9 | at Navy* | Navy–Marine Corps Memorial Stadium; Annapolis, MD | L 21–28 | 16,907 | |
| November 16 | at Furman | Sirrine Stadium; Greenville, SC (rivalry) | W 24–0 | | |
| November 23 | Davidson^{†} | Johnson Hagood Stadium; Charleston, SC | W 56–21 | | |
*Non-conference game; ^{†}Homecoming; Rankings from AP Poll released prior to the game
