= J. T. Turner =

American football player (born 1953)

No. 68, 60
- Position: Guard

Personal information
- Born: April 17, 1953 (age 73); Moultrie, Georgia, U.S.
- Listed height: 6 ft 3 in (1.91 m)
- Listed weight: 253 lb (115 kg)

Career information
- High school: Benjamin Franklin
- College: Duke
- NFL draft: 1975: undrafted

Career history
- Kansas City Chiefs (1975)*; New York Giants (1977–1983); Washington Redskins (1984)
- * Offseason or practice squad member only

Awards and highlights
- First-team All-ACC (1974)

Career NFL statistics
- Games played: 103
- Games started: 86
- Fumble recoveries: 1
- Stats at Pro Football Reference

James Denis Turner (born April 17, 1953) is an American former professional football player who was a guard in the National Football League (NFL) for the New York Giants and the Washington Redskins. He played college football for the Duke Blue Devils before joining the Charlotte Hornets in the World Football League (WFL) in 1975 as a defensive tackle and, in 1985, the Jacksonville Bulls of the United States Football League (USFL).

Turner played the role of the Even Bigger Black Guy in the movie Trading Places (1983), which starred Dan Aykroyd and Eddie Murphy. His character repeatedly utters the word 'Yeah' in a tone described by The New York Times as 'deeper than deep' to Billy Ray Valentine, played by Murphy, while imprisoned in a jail cell.
