= 1982 Maryland Terrapins football team =

American college football season

1982 Maryland Terrapins football

Aloha Bowl, L 20–21 vs. Washington
- Conference: Atlantic Coast Conference

Ranking
- Coaches: No. 20
- AP: No. 20
- Record: 8–4 (5–1 ACC)
- Head coach: Bobby Ross (1st season)
- Offensive coordinator: Ralph Friedgen (1st season)
- Defensive coordinator: Gib Romaine (1st season)
- Home stadium: Byrd Stadium

1982 Atlantic Coast Conference football standings
	Conf.					Overall
Team	W		L		T	W		L		T
No. 8 Clemson $	6	–	0	–	0	9	–	1	–	1
No. 20 Maryland	5	–	1	–	0	8	–	4	–	0
No. 18 North Carolina	3	–	3	–	0	8	–	4	–	0
Duke	3	–	3	–	0	6	–	5	–	0
NC State	3	–	3	–	0	6	–	5	–	0
Virginia	1	–	5	–	0	2	–	9	–	0
Wake Forest	0	–	6	–	0	3	–	8	–	0
$ – Conference champion; Rankings from AP Poll

The 1982 Maryland Terrapins football team represented the University of Maryland in the 1982 NCAA Division I-A football season. In their first season under head coach Bobby Ross, the Terrapins compiled an 8–4 record, finished in second place in the Atlantic Coast Conference, and outscored their opponents 373 to 220. Ranked No. 19 at the end of the regular season, Maryland lost to No. 9 Washington in the 1982 Aloha Bowl. The team's statistical leaders included Boomer Esiason with 2,302 passing yards, Willie Joyner with 1,039 rushing yards, and Russell Davis with 445 receiving yards.

== Schedule ==
Date	Time	Opponent	Rank	Site	TV	Result	Attendance	Source
September 11		at No. 7 Penn State*		Beaver Stadium; University Park, PA (rivalry)	TCS	L 31–38	84,597	
September 18		at No. 17 West Virginia*		Mountaineer Field; Morgantown, WV (rivalry)		L 18–19	56,042	
September 25		NC State		Byrd Stadium; College Park, MD		W 23–6	34,300	
October 2		at Syracuse*		Carrier Dome; Syracuse, NY		W 26–3	30,214	
October 9		Indiana State*		Byrd Stadium; College Park, MD		W 38–0	31,500	
October 16		Wake Forest		Byrd Stadium; College Park, MD		W 52–31	35,100	
October 23		Duke		Byrd Stadium; College Park, MD		W 49–22	40,100	
October 30		at No. 10 North Carolina		Kenan Memorial Stadium; Chapel Hill, NC	CBS	W 31–24	51,319	
November 6	1:31 p.m.	Miami (FL)*	No. 19	Byrd Stadium; College Park, MD		W 18–17	43,200	
November 13		No. 11 Clemson	No. 18	Byrd Stadium; College Park, MD	CBS	L 22–24	51,750	
November 20		at Virginia	No. 19	Scott Stadium; Charlottesville, VA (rivalry)		W 45–14	20,002	
December 25		vs. No. 9 Washington*	No. 16	Aloha Stadium; Halawa, HI (Aloha Bowl)	ESPN	L 20–21	30,055	
*Non-conference game; Rankings from AP Poll released prior to the game; All times are in Eastern time

== Roster ==
1982 Maryland Terrapins football team roster
Players
Coaches
Offense

Pos.	#	Name	Class
RB		Rich Badanjek
RB		Joe Brkovich
RB		Vernon Carter
RB		Dave D'Addio
WR		Russell Davis
WR		Darryl Emerson
QB	7	Boomer Esiason	Jr
TE		Ron Fazio
QB	8	Stan Gelbaugh	So
C	70	Kevin Glover	So
WR		Greg Hill
RB		Troy Island
RB		Willie Joyner
RB		Vic Kronberg
WR		Mike Lewis
OL		Len Lynch
RB		John Nash
OL		David Parcells
QB	14	Frank Reich	So
TE		Chris Renaldo
WR		Spencer Scriber
G	66	Ron Solt	Jr
RB		David Taylor
TE	82	John Tice	Sr
OL		Vince Tomasetti
OL		Harry Venezia
RB		Tim Whittie

Defense

Pos.	#	Name	Class
DL		Brian Baker
DB		Clarence Baldwin
DL		Gurnest Brown
DL		Mike Corvino
DL		Mark Duda
DL		Howard Eubanks
DL		Tyrone Furman
DL		J.D. Gross
DB		Bobby Gunderman
DB		Gil Hoffman
DB		Lendell Jones
DL		Frank Kalencik
DT	79	Pete Koch	Jr
LB		Mike Muller
LB	55	Eric Wilson	So

Special teams

Pos.	#	Name	Class
K	90	Jess Atkinson	So
P		Alan Sadler

Head coach

- Bobby Ross

Coordinators/assistant coaches

Legend

- (C) Team captain
- (S) Suspended
- (I) Ineligible
- Injured
- Redshirt
