= 1974 Richmond Spiders football team =

American college football season

1974 Richmond Spiders football
- Conference: Southern Conference
- Record: 5–5 (3–3 SoCon)
- Head coach: Jim Tait (1st season)
- Captains: Harry Knight; Ramon Perez; Ace Owens
- Home stadium: City Stadium

1974 Southern Conference football standings
	Conf.					Overall
Team	W		L		T	W		L		T
VMI $	5	–	1	–	0	7	–	4	–	0
Appalachian State	4	–	1	–	0	6	–	5	–	0
East Carolina	3	–	3	–	0	7	–	4	–	0
Richmond	3	–	3	–	0	5	–	5	–	0
The Citadel	3	–	4	–	0	4	–	7	–	0
William & Mary	2	–	3	–	0	4	–	7	–	0
Furman	2	–	4	–	0	5	–	6	–	0
Davidson	0	–	3	–	0	2	–	7	–	0
$ – Conference champion

The 1974 Richmond Spiders football team was an American football team that represented the University of Richmond as a member of the Southern Conference (SoCon) during the 1974 NCAA Division I football season. In their first season under head coach Jim Tait, Richmond compiled a 5–5 record, with a mark of 3–3 in conference play, finishing tied for third in the SoCon.

== Schedule ==
Date	Opponent	Site	Result	Attendance	Source
September 7	Villanova*	City Stadium; Richmond, VA	W 14–13	5,000	
September 14	at West Virginia*	Mountaineer Field; Morgantown, WV	W 29–25	29,750	
September 28	at The Citadel	Johnson Hagood Stadium; Charleston, SC	W 27–24	7,485	
October 5	Furman	City Stadium; Richmond, VA	L 14–24	13,000	
October 12	at Ball State*	Ball State Stadium; Muncie, IN	L 23–38	14,351	
October 26	at Virginia Tech*	Lane Stadium; Blacksburg, VA	L 7–41	40,000	
November 2	VMI	City Stadium; Richmond, VA	W 17–14	15,000	
November 9	East Carolina	City Stadium; Richmond, VA	W 28–20	14,000	
November 16	Appalachian State	City Stadium; Richmond, VA	L 13–14	10,000	
November 23	William & Mary	City Stadium; Richmond, VA (rivalry)	L 12–54	10,000	
*Non-conference game
