= 1974 Liberty Bowl =

American college football game

- 16th Liberty Bowl
Maryland Terrapins	Tennessee Volunteers
(8–3)	(6–3–2)
ACC	SEC
3	7
Head coach: Jerry Claiborne	Head coach: Bill Battle
AP / Coaches; 10 / 11
	1	2	3	4	Total
Maryland	0	3	0	0	3
Tennessee	0	0	0	7	7
- Date: December 16, 1974
- Season: 1974
- Stadium: Memphis Memorial Stadium
- Location: Memphis, Tennessee
- MVP: DT Randy White (Maryland)
- Referee: Charles Bowen (SEC; split crew: SEC, ACC)
- Attendance: 51,284

United States TV coverage
- Network: ABC
- Announcers: Keith Jackson and Bud Wilkinson

The 1974 Liberty Bowl was a college football postseason bowl game played on December 16, 1974, in Memphis, Tennessee. In the 16th edition of the Liberty Bowl, the Tennessee Volunteers defeated the Maryland Terrapins, 7–3.

== Background ==
Maryland won eight games for the second straight year, but this time they were champions of the Atlantic Coast Conference. Losses to #3 Alabama and Florida dropped them out of the rankings to start the season, but they won the next five games to rise back to #15 heading into a game with #10 Penn State. A 24–17 loss was their last loss of the regular season as they won the next three games to finish with a perfect conference record and a #10 ranking heading into their first ever Liberty Bowl and second straight bowl appearance.

As for Tennessee, they won fewer games than the previous season for the second straight season while finishing tied for 7th in the Southeastern Conference. They were 0–1–1 against ranked opponents (tying #12 UCLA and losing to #4 Alabama), but they managed to be invited to their fifth bowl game of the decade, with their first Liberty Bowl appearance since 1971.

== Game summary ==
A Bob Smith punt return for 63 yards set up a Steve Mike-Mayer field goal from 28 yards out to give Maryland a 3–0 lead in the first half. Tennessee attempted to tie the game with eight minutes remaining on a field goal by Ricky Townsend, but a juggled snap by QB Condredge Holloway (later knocked out of the game) led to a blocked kick by Randy White. On a Maryland punt, center Marion Koprowski's snap went over Phil Wangenheim, falling at the Tennessee 7 where the Vols recovered the ball. On third down, backup quarterback Randy Wallace threw an 11-yard touchdown pass to Larry Seivers with 2:38 remaining to give the Vols the 7–3 lead. Maryland drove down the field, reaching the Tennessee 20 with less than a minute to go after Frank Russell caught an option pass from Louis Carter. With nine seconds to go, Ernie Ward intercepted Bob Avellini's pass at the two yard line to seal the game.

Maryland won the first down total (16–15), the passing total (158–65), but they were outrushed by Tennessee (173–108) and they gave up the ball five times, including three fumbles, while the Vols gave up the ball just twice.

== Aftermath ==
Tennessee wouldn't go back to a bowl game until 1979, while not returning to the Liberty Bowl again until 1986. Maryland would reach four more bowl games in the decade while winning the conference twice. They have not returned to the Liberty Bowl since this game.
