= 1974 Furman Paladins football team =

American college football season

1974 Furman Paladins football
- Conference: Southern Conference
- Record: 5–6 (2–4 SoCon)
- Head coach: Art Baker (2nd season)
- Captains: Vince Perone Jr.; Charles Elvington; Bill Anderson
- Home stadium: Sirrine Stadium

1974 Southern Conference football standings
	Conf.					Overall
Team	W		L		T	W		L		T
VMI $	5	–	1	–	0	7	–	4	–	0
Appalachian State	4	–	1	–	0	6	–	5	–	0
East Carolina	3	–	3	–	0	7	–	4	–	0
Richmond	3	–	3	–	0	5	–	5	–	0
The Citadel	3	–	4	–	0	4	–	7	–	0
William & Mary	2	–	3	–	0	4	–	7	–	0
Furman	2	–	4	–	0	5	–	6	–	0
Davidson	0	–	3	–	0	2	–	7	–	0
$ – Conference champion

The 1974 Furman Paladins football team represented the Furman University as a member of the Southern Conference (SoCon) during the 1974 NCAA Division I football season. Led by Art Baker in his second year as head coach, William & Mary Furman the season 5–6 overall and 2–4 in SoCon play to place seventh.

== Schedule ==
Date	Opponent	Site	Result	Attendance	Source
September 14	at VMI	Alumni Memorial Field; Lexington, VA	L 0–7	5,800	
September 21	Presbyterian*	Sirrine Stadium; Greenville, SC	W 22–19	16,000	
September 28	William & Mary	Sirrine Stadium; Greenville, SC	W 10–0	12,000	
October 5	at Richmond	City Stadium; Richmond, VA	W 24–14	13,000	
October 12	East Carolina	Sirrine Stadium; Greenville, SC	L 12–15	16,800	
October 19	at East Tennessee State*	University Stadium; Johnson City, TN	L 13–24	4,500	
October 26	Wofford*	Sirrine Stadium; Greenville, SC (rivalry)	W 21–10		
November 2	at Appalachian State	Conrad Stadium; Boone, NC	L 3–27	12,291	
November 9	Lenoir–Rhyne*	Sirrine Stadium; Greenville, SC	W 14–10	11,000	
November 16	The Citadel	Sirrine Stadium; Greenville, SC (rivalry)	L 0–24		
November 23	Wake Forest*	Groves Stadium; Winston-Salem, NC	L 10–16	7,800	
*Non-conference game

== Roster ==
1974 Furman Paladins football team roster
Players			Coaches
Offense: Pos. / # / Name / Class; QB / 11 / David Whitehurst / So	Defense: Pos. / # / Name / Class; DE / / Steve Patton / So	Special teams: Pos. / # / Name / Class	Head coach: Art Baker; Coordinators/assistant coaches Legend: (C) Team captain; (S) Suspended; (I) Ineligible; Injured; Redshirt
