= 1974 Davidson Wildcats football team =

American college football season

1974 Davidson Wildcats football
- Conference: Southern Conference
- Record: 2–7 (0–3 SoCon)
- Head coach: Ed Farrell (1st season)
- Home stadium: Richardson Stadium

1974 Southern Conference football standings
| | Conf. | | | | | Overall |
| Team | W | | L | | T | W | | L | | T |
|---|---|---|---|---|---|---|---|---|---|---|
| VMI $ | 5 | – | 1 | – | 0 | 7 | – | 4 | – | 0 |
| Appalachian State | 4 | – | 1 | – | 0 | 6 | – | 5 | – | 0 |
| East Carolina | 3 | – | 3 | – | 0 | 7 | – | 4 | – | 0 |
| Richmond | 3 | – | 3 | – | 0 | 5 | – | 5 | – | 0 |
| The Citadel | 3 | – | 4 | – | 0 | 4 | – | 7 | – | 0 |
| William & Mary | 2 | – | 3 | – | 0 | 4 | – | 7 | – | 0 |
| Furman | 2 | – | 4 | – | 0 | 5 | – | 6 | – | 0 |
| Davidson | 0 | – | 3 | – | 0 | 2 | – | 7 | – | 0 |
$ – Conference champion

The 1974 Davidson Wildcats football team represented Davidson College as a member of the Southern Conference (SoCon) during the 1974 NCAA Division I football season. Led by first-year head coach Ed Farrell, the Wildcats compiled an overall record of 2–7 with a mark of 0–3 in conference play, placing last out of eight teams in the SoCon.

== Schedule ==
| Date | Opponent | Site | Result | Attendance | Source |
|---|---|---|---|---|---|
| September 21 | Appalachian State | Richardson Stadium; Davidson, NC | L 0–30 | 7,600 | |
| September 28 | VMI | Richardson Stadium; Davidson, NC | L 7–43 | 4,500 | |
| October 12 | at Wofford* | Snyder Field; Spartanburg, SC | L 7–49 | 5,800 | |
| October 19 | at Lenoir–Rhyne* | Moretz Stadium; Hickory, NC | L 7–48 | 7,000 | |
| October 26 | Hampden–Sydney*^{†} | Richardson Stadium; Davidson, NC | W 17–16 | 5,500 | |
| November 2 | at Guilford* | Greensboro, NC | L 14–31 | 3,000 | |
| November 9 | at Lehigh* | Taylor Stadium; Bethlehem, PA | L 6–53 | 7,000 | |
| November 16 | Defiance* | Richardson Stadium; Davidson, NC | W 28–20 | 1,000 | |
| November 23 | at The Citadel | Johnson Hagood Stadium; Charleston, SC | L 21–56 | | |
*Non-conference game; ^{†}Homecoming
