= 1974 East Tennessee State Buccaneers football team =

American college football season

1974 East Tennessee State Buccaneers football
- Conference: Ohio Valley Conference
- Record: 4–6–1 (3–3–1 OVC)
- Head coach: Roy Frazier (2nd season)
- Home stadium: Memorial Stadium

1974 Ohio Valley Conference football standings
	Conf.					Overall
Team	W		L		T	W		L		T
Eastern Kentucky $	6	–	1	–	0	8	–	2	–	0
Murray State	5	–	2	–	0	9	–	2	–	0
Western Kentucky	5	–	2	–	0	7	–	3	–	0
Tennessee Tech	4	–	3	–	0	6	–	5	–	0
East Tennessee State	3	–	3	–	1	4	–	6	–	1
Middle Tennessee	2	–	5	–	0	3	–	8	–	0
Austin Peay	1	–	5	–	1	3	–	7	–	1
Morehead State	1	–	6	–	0	3	–	8	–	0
$ – Conference champion

The 1974 East Tennessee State Buccaneers football team represented East Tennessee State University as a member of the Ohio Valley Conference (OVC) during the 1974 NCAA Division II football season. Led by second-year head coach Roy Frazier, the Buccaneers compiled an overall record of 4–6–1, with a mark of 3–3–1 in conference play, and finished fifth in the OVC.

== Schedule ==
Date	Opponent	Site	Result	Attendance	Source
September 7	at Appalachian State*	Conrad Stadium; Boone, NC	L 7–16	8,500	
September 14	at Carson–Newman*	Burke–Tarr Stadium; Jefferson City, TN	L 7–17	4,620	
September 21	at East Carolina*	Ficklen Memorial Stadium; Greenville, NC	L 8–24	16,226	
September 28	at Eastern Kentucky	Hanger Field; Richmond, KY	L 20–21	15,750	
October 5	No. 2 Western Kentucky	Memorial Stadium; Johnson City, TN	L 0–24	5,213	
October 19	Furman*	Memorial Stadium; Johnson City, TN	W 24–13	4,500	
October 26	at Murray State	Roy Stewart Stadium; Murray, KY	L 3–17	13,149	
November 2	Tennessee Tech	Memorial Stadium; Johnson City, TN	W 13–0	3,116	
November 9	Morehead State	Memorial Stadium; Johnson City, TN	W 13–0	6,327	
November 16	at Middle Tennessee	Horace Jones Field; Murfreesboro, TN	W 17–7	3,300	
November 23	Austin Peay	Memorial Stadium; Johnson City, TN	T 13–13	2,784	
*Non-conference game; Rankings from AP Poll released prior to the game; Source:
