= 1974 North Carolina Tar Heels football team =

American college football season

1974 North Carolina Tar Heels football

Sun Bowl, L 24–26 vs. Mississippi State
- Conference: Atlantic Coast Conference
- Record: 7–5 (4–2 ACC)
- Head coach: Bill Dooley (8th season)
- Captains: Ken Huff; Chris Kupec
- Home stadium: Kenan Memorial Stadium

1974 Atlantic Coast Conference football standings
	Conf.					Overall
Team	W		L		T	W		L		T
No. 13 Maryland $	6	–	0	–	0	8	–	4	–	0
No. 11 NC State	4	–	2	–	0	9	–	2	–	1
Clemson	4	–	2	–	0	7	–	4	–	0
North Carolina	4	–	2	–	0	7	–	5	–	0
Duke	2	–	4	–	0	6	–	5	–	0
Virginia	1	–	5	–	0	4	–	7	–	0
Wake Forest	0	–	6	–	0	1	–	10	–	0
$ – Conference champion; Rankings from AP Poll

The 1974 North Carolina Tar Heels football team represented the University of North Carolina at Chapel Hill during the 1974 NCAA Division I football season. The Tar Heels were led by eighth-year head coach Bill Dooley and played their home games at Kenan Memorial Stadium in Chapel Hill, North Carolina. They competed as members of the Atlantic Coast Conference, finishing in fourth.

== Schedule ==
Date	Time	Opponent	Site	TV	Result	Attendance	Source
September 14	1:30 p.m.	Ohio*	Kenan Memorial Stadium; Chapel Hill, NC		W 42–7	33,000	
September 21	1:30 p.m.	at Wake Forest	Groves Stadium; Winston-Salem, NC (rivalry)		W 31–0	27,200	
September 28	1:30 p.m.	at Maryland	Byrd Stadium; College Park, MD		L 12–24	17,800	
October 5	1:30 p.m.	No. 17 Pittsburgh*	Kenan Memorial Stadium; Chapel Hill, NC		W 45–29	44,800	
October 12	3:00 p.m.	at Georgia Tech*	Grant Field; Atlanta, GA		L 28–29	38,413	
October 19	1:30 p.m.	No. 10 NC State	Kenan Memorial Stadium; Chapel Hill, NC (rivalry)		W 33–14	49,674	
October 26	7:30 p.m.	at South Carolina*	Williams–Brice Stadium; Columbia, SC (rivalry)		L 23–31	41,512	
November 2	1:30 p.m.	Virginia	Kenan Memorial Stadium; Chapel Hill, NC (South's Oldest Rivalry)		W 24–10	38,500	
November 9	1:00 p.m.	at Clemson	Memorial Stadium; Clemson, SC		L 32–54	40,529	
November 16	1:30 p.m.	Army*	Kenan Memorial Stadium; Chapel Hill, NC		W 56–42	38,900	
November 23	1:30 p.m.	Duke	Kenan Memorial Stadium; Chapel Hill, NC (Victory Bell)		W 14–13	47,300	
December 28	12:00 p.m.	vs. Mississippi State*	Sun Bowl; El Paso, TX (Sun Bowl)	CBS	L 24–26	26,035	
*Non-conference game; Rankings from AP Poll released prior to the game; All times are in Eastern time
