= 1974 Clemson Tigers football team =

American college football season

1974 Clemson Tigers football
- Conference: Atlantic Coast Conference
- Record: 7–4 (4–2 ACC)
- Head coach: Red Parker (2nd season)
- Offensive coordinator: Don Murry (1st season)
- Defensive coordinator: Harold Steelman (1st season)
- Captains: Willie Anderson; Mark Fellers; Jim Ness; Ken Peeples
- Home stadium: Memorial Stadium

1974 Atlantic Coast Conference football standings
	Conf.					Overall
Team	W		L		T	W		L		T
No. 13 Maryland $	6	–	0	–	0	8	–	4	–	0
No. 11 NC State	4	–	2	–	0	9	–	2	–	1
Clemson	4	–	2	–	0	7	–	4	–	0
North Carolina	4	–	2	–	0	7	–	5	–	0
Duke	2	–	4	–	0	6	–	5	–	0
Virginia	1	–	5	–	0	4	–	7	–	0
Wake Forest	0	–	6	–	0	1	–	10	–	0
$ – Conference champion; Rankings from AP Poll

The 1974 Clemson Tigers football team was an American football team that represented Clemson University in the Atlantic Coast Conference (ACC) during the 1974 NCAA Division I football season. In its second season under head coach Red Parker, the team compiled a 7–4 record (4–2 against conference opponents), tied for second place in the ACC, and was outscored by a total of 250 to 246. The team played its home games at Memorial Stadium in Clemson, South Carolina.

Willie Anderson, Mark Fellers, Jim Ness, and Ken Peeples were the team captains. The team's statistical leaders included quarterback Mark Fellers with 783 passing yards and 54 points scored (9 touchdowns), running back Ken Callicutt with 809 rushing yards, and Bennie Cunningham with 391 receiving yards.

== Schedule ==
Date	Time	Opponent	Site	Result	Attendance	Source
September 14	5:00 p.m.	at Texas A&M*	Kyle Field; College Station, TX	L 0–24	38,792	
September 21	7:00 p.m.	at No. 15 NC State	Carter Stadium; Raleigh, NC (rivalry)	L 10–31	38,800	
September 28	1:00 p.m.	Georgia Tech*	Memorial Stadium; Clemson, SC (rivalry)	W 21–17	40,275	
October 5	1:00 p.m.	Georgia*	Memorial Stadium; Clemson, SC (rivalry)	W 28–24	42,933	
October 12	1:30 p.m.	at Maryland	Byrd Stadium; College Park, MD	L 0–41	32,644	
October 19	1:00 p.m.	Duke^{†}	Memorial Stadium; Clemson, SC	W 17–13	42,354	
October 26	2:00 p.m.	at Tennessee*	Neyland Stadium; Knoxville, TN	L 28–29	66,334	
November 2	1:30 p.m.	at Wake Forest	Groves Stadium; Winston-Salem, NC	W 21–9	13,200	
November 9	1:00 p.m.	North Carolina	Memorial Stadium; Clemson, SC	W 54–32	40,529	
November 16	1:00 p.m.	Virginia	Memorial Stadium; Clemson, SC	W 28–9	32,656	
November 23	1:00 p.m.	South Carolina*	Memorial Stadium; Clemson, SC (Palmetto Bowl)	W 39–21	52,677	
*Non-conference game; ^{†}Homecoming; Rankings from AP Poll released prior to the game; All times are in Eastern time
