= 1982 Clemson Tigers football team =

American college football season

1982 Clemson Tigers football

ACC champion
- Conference: Atlantic Coast Conference

Ranking
- AP: No. 8
- Record: 9–1–1 (6–0 ACC)
- Head coach: Danny Ford (4th full, 5th overall season)
- Offensive coordinator: Nelson Stokley (3rd season)
- Captains: Homer Jordan; Terry Kinard
- Home stadium: Memorial Stadium

1982 Atlantic Coast Conference football standings
	Conf.					Overall
Team	W		L		T	W		L		T
No. 8 Clemson $	6	–	0	–	0	9	–	1	–	1
No. 20 Maryland	5	–	1	–	0	8	–	4	–	0
No. 18 North Carolina	3	–	3	–	0	8	–	4	–	0
Duke	3	–	3	–	0	6	–	5	–	0
NC State	3	–	3	–	0	6	–	5	–	0
Virginia	1	–	5	–	0	2	–	9	–	0
Wake Forest	0	–	6	–	0	3	–	8	–	0
$ – Conference champion; Rankings from AP Poll

The 1982 Clemson Tigers football team was an American football team that represented Clemson University in the Atlantic Coast Conference (ACC) during the 1982 NCAA Division I-A football season. In its fifth season under head coach Danny Ford, the team compiled a 9–1–1 record (6–0 against conference opponents), won the ACC championship, was ranked No. 8 in the final AP Poll, and outscored opponents by a total of 289 to 147. The team played its home games at Memorial Stadium in Clemson, South Carolina.

The defending national champion, Clemson started the year with a loss to Georgia and a tie with Boston College. The team climbed back up the rankings by winning their next nine games, but the season was derailed when Clemson was placed on probation near the end of the season for recruiting violations, and was made ineligible for a bowl bid.

Lee Nanney and Willie Underwood were the team captains. The team's statistical leaders included quarterback Homer Jordan with 674 passing yards, Cliff Austin with 1,064 rushing yards and 84 points scored (14 touchdowns), and Frank Magwood with 414 receiving yards.

== Schedule ==
Date	Time	Opponent	Rank	Site	Result	Attendance	Source
September 6	9:00 p.m.	at No. 7 Georgia*	No. 11	Sanford Stadium; Athens, GA (rivalry)	L 7–13	82,122	
September 18	1:00 p.m.	Boston College*	No. 16	Memorial Stadium; Clemson, SC (rivalry)	T 17–17	63,118	
September 25	1:00 p.m.	Western Carolina*		Memorial Stadium; Clemson, SC	W 21–10	61,369	
October 2	1:00 p.m.	Kentucky*^{†}		Memorial Stadium; Clemson, SC	W 24–6	63,115	
October 9	8:00 p.m.	at Virginia		Scott Stadium; Charlottesville, VA	W 48–0	30,971	
October 16	1:00 p.m.	Duke	No. 20	Memorial Stadium; Clemson, SC	W 49–14	62,822	
October 23	1:00 p.m.	at NC State	No. 18	Carter–Finley Stadium; Raleigh, NC (Textile Bowl)	W 38–29	47,300	
November 6	1:00 p.m.	No. 18 North Carolina	No. 13	Memorial Stadium; Clemson, SC	W 16–13	63,718–63,788	
November 13	1:30 p.m.	at No. 18 Maryland	No. 11	Byrd Stadium; College Park, MD	W 24–22	51,750	
November 20	1:00 p.m.	South Carolina*	No. 10	Memorial Stadium; Clemson, SC (rivalry)	W 24–6	64,700–66,510	
November 28	11:00 p.m.	vs. Wake Forest	No. 10	National Stadium; Tokyo, Japan (Mirage Bowl)	W 21–17	80,000	
*Non-conference game; ^{†}Homecoming; Rankings from AP Poll released prior to the game; All times are in Eastern time

== Personnel ==
1982 Clemson Tigers football team roster
Players
Coaches
Offense

Pos.	#	Name	Class
WR		Kendall Alley
RB		Cliff Austin
WR		Fitzhugh Bethea
OL		Gary Brown
OL		Brian Butcher
WR		Richard Butler
RB		Brandon Crite
TE		Bubba Diggs
RB		Stacey Driver
QB		Mike Eppley
OL		James Farr
RB		Terrence Flagler
RB		Steve Griffin
QB		Homer Jordan	Sr
RB	27	Kevin Mack	Jr
WR		Frank Magwood
OL		Cary Massaro
OL		Bob Mayberry
RB		Chuck McSwain
QB		Anthony Parate
WR		Jeff Stockstill
RB		Braxton Williams

Defense

Pos.	#	Name	Class
DL		Dan Benish
DB		Tim Childers
LB	24	Billy Davis	Jr
DB		Ty Davis
DB		John Duncan
DL		Andy Headen
S	43	Terry Kinard	Sr
LB		Otis Lindsey
CB, WR	28	Rod McSwain	Jr
DL		William Perry
DL		Edgar Pickett
DB		Reggie Pleasant
LB		Johnny Rembert
DL		Jim Scott
LB		Danny Triplett

Special teams

Pos.	#	Name	Class
P	5	Dale Hatcher	So
K	8	Donald Igwebuike	So

Head coach

- Danny Ford

Coordinators/assistant coaches

Legend

- (C) Team captain
- (S) Suspended
- (I) Ineligible
- Injured
- Redshirt
