= 1982 North Carolina Tar Heels football team =

American college football season

1982 North Carolina Tar Heels football

Sun Bowl champion

Sun Bowl, W 26–10 vs. Texas
- Conference: Atlantic Coast Conference

Ranking
- Coaches: No. 13
- AP: No. 18
- Record: 8–4 (3–3 ACC)
- Head coach: Dick Crum (5th season)
- Captain: David Drechsler
- Home stadium: Kenan Memorial Stadium

1982 Atlantic Coast Conference football standings
	Conf.					Overall
Team	W		L		T	W		L		T
No. 8 Clemson $	6	–	0	–	0	9	–	1	–	1
No. 20 Maryland	5	–	1	–	0	8	–	4	–	0
No. 18 North Carolina	3	–	3	–	0	8	–	4	–	0
Duke	3	–	3	–	0	6	–	5	–	0
NC State	3	–	3	–	0	6	–	5	–	0
Virginia	1	–	5	–	0	2	–	9	–	0
Wake Forest	0	–	6	–	0	3	–	8	–	0
$ – Conference champion; Rankings from AP Poll

The 1982 North Carolina Tar Heels football team represented the University of North Carolina at Chapel Hill during the 1982 NCAA Division I-A football season. The Tar Heels were led by fifth-year head coach Dick Crum and played their home games at Kenan Memorial Stadium in Chapel Hill, North Carolina. They competed as members of the Atlantic Coast Conference and finished tied for third place.

== Schedule ==
Date	Time	Opponent	Rank	Site	TV	Result	Attendance	Source
September 9	9:00 p.m.	at No. 1 Pittsburgh*	No. 5	Three Rivers Stadium; Pittsburgh, PA	CBS	L 6–7	54,449	
September 18	1:00 p.m.	Vanderbilt*	No. 11	Kenan Memorial Stadium; Chapel Hill, NC		W 34–10	51,696	
September 25	1:00 p.m.	Army*	No. 11	Kenan Memorial Stadium; Chapel Hill, NC		W 62–8	50,950	
October 2	1:00 p.m.	Georgia Tech*	No. 12	Kenan Memorial Stadium; Chapel Hill, NC	ABC	W 41–0	49,500	
October 9	1:00 p.m.	at Wake Forest	No. 12	Groves Stadium; Winston-Salem, NC (rivalry)		W 24–7	36,200	
October 16	1:00 p.m.	NC State	No. 11	Kenan Memorial Stadium; Chapel Hill, NC (rivalry)		W 41–9	53,278	
October 30	1:00 p.m.	Maryland	No. 10	Kenan Memorial Stadium; Chapel Hill, NC		L 24–31	51,319	
November 6	1:00 p.m.	at No. 13 Clemson	No. 18	Memorial Stadium; Clemson, SC		L 13–16	63,718–63,788	
November 13	1:00 p.m.	Virginia		Kenan Memorial Stadium; Chapel Hill, NC (South's Oldest Rivalry)		W 27–14	49,500	
November 20	1:30 p.m.	at Duke		Wallace Wade Stadium; Durham, NC (Victory Bell)		L 17–23	33,941	
November 25	12:00 p.m.	Bowling Green*		Kenan Memorial Stadium; Chapel Hill, NC		W 33–14	33,000	
December 25	2:00 p.m.	vs. No. 8 Texas*		Sun Bowl; El Paso, TX (Sun Bowl)	CBS	W 26–10	31,359	
*Non-conference game; Rankings from AP Poll released prior to the game; All times are in Eastern time
