= 1982 Aloha Bowl =

American college football game

- 1st Aloha Bowl
Maryland Terrapins	Washington Huskies
(8-3)	(9–2)
20	21
Head coach: Bobby Ross	Head coach: Don James
AP / Coaches; 16 / 14	AP / Coaches; 9 / 8
	1	2	3	4	Total
Maryland	0	6	6	8	20
Washington	7	7	0	7	21
- Date: December 25, 1982
- Season: 1982
- Stadium: Aloha Stadium
- Location: Honolulu, Hawaii
- Referee: Jack Gatto (PCAA)
- Attendance: 30,055

United States TV coverage
- Network: ESPN/Metrosports
- Announcers: Harry Kalas (play-by-play); Joe Kapp (Color commentator); Les Keiter (sideline)

The 1982 Aloha Bowl was an American college football bowl game played on December 25, 1982 at Aloha Stadium in Honolulu, Hawaii. The inaugural Aloha Bowl game pitted the Washington Huskies and the Maryland Terrapins. This was the first bowl game played in Hawaii since the Pineapple Bowl in 1952, making this the first-ever bowl game in the State of Hawaii.

== Background ==
After a Rose Bowl championship the year prior, the Huskies began the season ranked #2 in the nation. They responded by winning their first seven games of the season while rising to #1 in the polls after the first week, though they slipped to #2 before a matchup with Stanford. A 43-31 loss to the Cardinal (who finished 5-6 that year) dropped them to #10, but they responded with wins over #9 UCLA and #3 Arizona State to get back to #5 heading into the final game of the year against Washington State in the Apple Cup, with a chance to win the conference title. However, they fell 24-20 to the Cougars (who finished 3-7-1), which dropped them to second in the Pacific-10 Conference behind UCLA (who had a 5-1-1 conference record). Despite this, the Huskies were invited to the Aloha Bowl, their fourth straight bowl game and fifth bowl game in six seasons. Maryland, in its first season with Bobby Ross as coach, rebounded from a 4-6-1 record the previous year to win eight games. Maryland began the season with two losses to ranked opponents (#7 Penn State and #17 West Virginia) by a combined total of nine points. They did not lose another game for two months, winning seven straight games (including a 31-24 win over #10 North Carolina), while rising to #19 in the polls. They lost to #11 Clemson two weeks later, though they did rebound with a win over Virginia in the regular season finale to rise to #16 in the polls while finishing 2nd in the Atlantic Coast Conference. This was their eighth bowl game in 10 seasons.

== Game summary ==
- Washington – Anthony Allen 27-yard touchdown pass from Tim Cowan (Nelson kick) 10:14
- Maryland - Dave D'Addio 9-yard touchdown pass from Boomer Esiason (kick failed) 14:52
- Washington - Allen 71-yard touchdown pass from Cowan (Nelson kick) 5:21
- Maryland - John Tice 36-yard touchdown pass from Esiason (conversion failed) 12:18
- Maryland - John Nash 2-yard touchdown run (Tice pass from Esiason) 10:44
- Washington - Allen 11-yard touchdown pass from Cowan (Nelson kick) 0:06

Washington had 20 first downs (as opposed to 17 for Maryland) while having 63 rushing yards and 369 passing yards, with four fumbles recovered for turnovers. Maryland had 68 rushing yards and 251 passing yards while having two turnovers. Boomer Esiason went 19-of-32 for 251 yards, with two touchdowns and one interception (along with a 10 completed passes for 120 yards and 1 touchdown third quarter). With 3:39 left in the game, Jess Atkinson attempted a 32-yard field goal to try to put the Terrapins up by nine. However, the kick fell short. A touchdown with six seconds left in the game by Allen won the game for Washington, who won the arm of Tim Cowan, who threw 33-of-55 for 369 yards and three touchdowns.

== Aftermath ==
The Huskies returned to the Aloha Bowl twice more, including the following year in 1983. They reached five more bowl games in the decade following their Aloha Bowl appearances. As for Maryland, they went to three more bowl games in the decade while never returning to the Aloha Bowl.
