= 1974 NC State Wolfpack football team =

American college football season

1974 NC State Wolfpack football

Astro-Bluebonnet Bowl, T 31–31 vs. Houston
- Conference: Atlantic Coast Conference

Ranking
- Coaches: No. 9
- AP: No. 11
- Record: 9–2–1 (4–2 ACC)
- Head coach: Lou Holtz (3rd season)
- Offensive coordinator: Brian Burke (3rd season)
- Home stadium: Carter Stadium

1974 Atlantic Coast Conference football standings
	Conf.					Overall
Team	W		L		T	W		L		T
No. 13 Maryland $	6	–	0	–	0	8	–	4	–	0
No. 11 NC State	4	–	2	–	0	9	–	2	–	1
Clemson	4	–	2	–	0	7	–	4	–	0
North Carolina	4	–	2	–	0	7	–	5	–	0
Duke	2	–	4	–	0	6	–	5	–	0
Virginia	1	–	5	–	0	4	–	7	–	0
Wake Forest	0	–	6	–	0	1	–	10	–	0
$ – Conference champion; Rankings from AP Poll

The 1974 NC State Wolfpack football team represented North Carolina State University during the 1974 NCAA Division I football season. The team's head coach was Lou Holtz. NC State has been a member of the Atlantic Coast Conference (ACC) since the league's inception in 1953. The Wolfpack played its home games in 1974 at Carter Stadium in Raleigh, North Carolina.

== Schedule ==
Date	Opponent	Rank	Site	Result	Attendance	Source
September 7	at Wake Forest	No. 18	Groves Stadium; Winston-Salem, NC (rivalry)	W 33–15	22,500	
September 14	Duke	No. 16	Carter Stadium; Raleigh, NC (rivalry)	W 35–21	42,200	
September 21	Clemson	No. 15	Carter Stadium; Raleigh, NC (rivalry)	W 31–10	38,800	
September 28	at Syracuse*	No. 13	Archbold Stadium; Syracuse, NY	W 28–22	17,997	
October 5	East Carolina*	No. 8	Carter Stadium; Raleigh, NC (rivalry)	W 24–20	42,800	
October 12	at Virginia	No. 11	Scott Stadium; Charlottesville, VA	W 22–21	27,100	
October 19	at North Carolina	No. 10	Kenan Memorial Stadium; Chapel Hill, NC (rivalry)	L 14–33	47,400	
October 26	at No. 15 Maryland	No. 17	Byrd Stadium; College Park, MD	L 10–20	49,674	
November 2	South Carolina*^{†}		Carter Stadium; Raleigh, NC	W 42–27	41,500	
November 9	No. 7 Penn State*		Carter Stadium; Raleigh, NC	W 12–7	47,700	
November 16	at Arizona State*	No. 16	Sun Devil Stadium; Tempe, AZ	W 35–14	50,000	
December 23	vs. Houston*	No. 13	Houston Astrodome; Houston, TX (Astro-Bluebonnet Bowl)	T 31–31	35,122	
*Non-conference game; ^{†}Homecoming; Rankings from AP Poll released prior to the game

== Team players drafted into the NFL ==
Player	Position	Round	Pick	NFL club
Stan Fritts	Running back	4	97	Cincinnati Bengals
Roland Hooks	Running back	10	253	Buffalo Bills
Frank Haywood	Defensive tackle	14	351	Cincinnati Bengals
