= Steve Mike-Mayer =

Hungarian gridiron football player (born 1947)

No. 10, 12, 5
- Position: Kicker

Personal information
- Born: September 8, 1947 (age 79); Budapest, Hungary
- Listed height: 6 ft 0 in (1.83 m)
- Listed weight: 180 lb (82 kg)

Career information
- High school: International School (Bologna, Italy)
- College: Maryland
- NFL draft: 1975: 3rd round, 72nd overall pick

Career history
- San Francisco 49ers (1975–1976); Detroit Lions (1977); New Orleans Saints (1978); Baltimore Colts (1979–1980)

Awards and highlights
- PFWA All-Rookie Team (1975); First-team All-ACC (1974)

Career NFL statistics
- Field goals made: 67
- Field goals attempted: 131
- Field goal %: 51.1
- Longest field goal: 54
- Stats at Pro Football Reference

Istvan "Steve" Mike-Mayer (/ˈmɪkəmaɪər/ MIK-ə-my-ər; born September 8, 1947) is a Hungarian former professional American football kicker in the National Football League (NFL) from 1975 to 1980 for the San Francisco 49ers, Detroit Lions, New Orleans Saints, and Baltimore Colts. His brother Nick Mike-Mayer also played in the NFL. Mike-Mayer played college football at the University of Maryland, College Park.

== Professional career ==
=== San Francisco 49ers ===
Mike-Mayer was selected in the third round (as the 72nd overall pick) by the San Francisco 49ers.

==== 1975 ====
In his rookie season, he would make just 14 of 28 attempted field goals, and would make 27 of his 31 attempted extra points. The 49ers would ultimately win just 5 games and miss the playoffs after losing their last 4 games. Because of his performance, Mike-Mayer earned a spot on the All-Rookie Team.

==== 1976 ====
In his second and last year with the 49ers, Mike-Mayer's kicking statistics only slightly improved, as he made 16 of 28 field goal attempts, and 26 of 30 extra point attempts. Although the 49ers' record would improve to 8–6, they would still miss the playoffs. After the end of the season, Mike-Mayer was released.

=== Detroit Lions ===
Mike-Mayer was picked up by the Detroit Lions in 1977. In his only season with the team, he made just 8 of his 19 field goal attempts, and made 19 of his 21 extra point attempts. The Lions would end the season 6–8, and ultimately miss the playoffs. After the end of the season, Mike-Mayer was released by the team.

=== New Orleans Saints ===
==== 1978 ====
Mike-Mayer was signed by the New Orleans Saints to start the 1978 season, and was reunited with former 49ers head coach Dick Nolan. In his only season with the team, Mike-Mayer made just 6 of 13 field goal attempts, and made all 18 of his extra-point attempts. He would be released by the team after playing just 9 games with them.

=== Baltimore Colts ===
==== 1979 ====
Mike-Mayer was signed by the Baltimore Colts to start the 1979 season. In his first season with the team, Mike-Mayer's kicking stats improved, as he made 11 of his 20 field goal attempts, and made 28 of his 29 extra point attempts. Despite Mike-Mayer's improvement with the Colts, the team would miss the playoffs with a 5–11 record.

==== 1980 ====
In his final season with Baltimore, Mike-Mayer's kicking would slightly regress again, as he made just 12 of his 23 field goal attempts, and made 43 of his 46 extra-points, making this his only season in which he successfully made more than 30 extra-point attempts. The Colts' record slightly improved to 7–9, although they still finished 4th in their division and were eliminated from playoff contention. Following the end of the season, Mike-Mayer retired from playing in the NFL.

== NFL career statistics ==
**Bold**	Career high

=== Regular season ===
Year	Team	GP	Overall FGs				PATs			Points
Year	Team	GP	Lng	FGM	FGA	Pct	XPM	XPA	Pct	Points
1975	SF	14	**54**	14	28	50.0	27	31	87.1	69
1976	SF	14	45	16	28	57.1	26	30	86.7	74
1977	DET	14	47	8	19	42.1	19	21	90.5	43
1978	NO	9	50	6	13	46.2	18	18	**100.0**	36
1979	BAL	13	41	11	20	55.0	28	29	96.6	61
1980	BAL	**16**	46	12	23	52.2	43	46	93.5	**79**
Career		80	54	67	131	51.1	161	175	92.0	362
