= 1974–75 NCAA football bowl games =

Series of post-season NCAA football games

- Season: 1974
- Number of bowls: 11
- Bowl games: December 16, 1974 – January 1, 1975
- National Championship: 1975 Rose Bowl
- Location of Championship: Rose Bowl, Pasadena, California
- Champions: USC (Coaches Poll)
Bowl record by conference
Conference	Bowls	Record	Final AP poll

The 1974–75 NCAA football bowl games were a series of post-season games played in December 1974 and January 1975 to end the 1974 NCAA Division I football season. A total of 11 team-competitive games were played. The post-season began with the Liberty Bowl on December 16, 1974, and concluded on January 1, 1975, with the Orange Bowl.

== Schedule ==
Date	Game	Site	TV	Teams	Results
Dec. 16	Liberty Bowl	Memphis Memorial Stadium; Memphis, Tennessee	ABC	Tennessee (6–3–2); No. 10 Maryland (8–3)	Tennessee 7 Maryland 3
Dec. 21	Tangerine Bowl	Tangerine Bowl; Orlando, Florida	Mizlou	No. 15 Miami (OH) (9–0–1); Georgia (6–5)	Miami 21; Georgia 10
Dec. 23	Astro-Bluebonnet Bowl	Astrodome; Houston, Texas	ABC	No. 13 NC State (9–2); Houston (8–3)	NC State 31; Houston 31
Dec. 28	Peach Bowl	Fulton County Stadium; Atlanta, Georgia	Mizlou	Vanderbilt (7–4–1); Texas Tech (6–4–1)	Vanderbilt 6 Texas Tech 6
Dec. 28	Sun Bowl	Sun Bowl; El Paso, Texas	CBS	Mississippi State (8–3); North Carolina (7–4)	Mississippi State 26; North Carolina 24
Dec. 28	Fiesta Bowl	Sun Devil Stadium; Tempe, Arizona	CBS	Oklahoma State (6–5); No. 17 BYU (7–3–1)	Oklahoma State 16; BYU 6
Dec. 30	Gator Bowl	Gator Bowl Stadium; Jacksonville, Florida	ABC	No. 6 Auburn (9–2); No. 11 Texas (8–3)	Auburn 27; Texas 3
Dec. 31	Sugar Bowl	Tulane Stadium; New Orleans, Louisiana	ABC	No. 8 Nebraska (8–3); No. 18 Florida (8–3)	Nebraska 13; Florida 10
Jan. 1	Cotton Bowl Classic	Cotton Bowl; Dallas, Texas	CBS	No. 7 Penn State (9–2); No. 12 Baylor (8–3)	Penn State 41; Baylor 20
Jan. 1	Rose Bowl	Rose Bowl; Pasadena, California	NBC	No. 5 USC (9–1–1); No. 3 Ohio State (10–1)	USC 18; Ohio State 17
Jan. 1	Orange Bowl	Miami Orange Bowl; Miami, Florida	NBC	No. 9 Notre Dame (9–2); No. 2 Alabama (11–0)	Notre Dame 13; Alabama 11

Rankings from AP Poll
