= 1974 Kentucky Wildcats football team =

American college football season

1974 Kentucky Wildcats football
- Conference: Southeastern Conference
- Record: 6–5 (3–3 SEC)
- Head coach: Fran Curci (2nd season)
- Offensive coordinator: Jon Mirilovich (2nd season)
- Defensive coordinator: Bill Narduzzi (2nd season)
- Home stadium: Commonwealth Stadium

1974 Southeastern Conference football standings
| | Conf. | | | | | Overall |
| Team | W | | L | | T | W | | L | | T |
|---|---|---|---|---|---|---|---|---|---|---|
| No. 5 Alabama $ | 6 | – | 0 | – | 0 | 11 | – | 1 | – | 0 |
| No. 8 Auburn | 4 | – | 2 | – | 0 | 10 | – | 2 | – | 0 |
| Georgia | 4 | – | 2 | – | 0 | 6 | – | 6 | – | 0 |
| No. 17 Mississippi State | 3 | – | 3 | – | 0 | 9 | – | 3 | – | 0 |
| No. 15 Florida | 3 | – | 3 | – | 0 | 8 | – | 4 | – | 0 |
| Kentucky | 3 | – | 3 | – | 0 | 6 | – | 5 | – | 0 |
| No. 20 Tennessee | 2 | – | 3 | – | 1 | 7 | – | 3 | – | 2 |
| Vanderbilt | 2 | – | 3 | – | 1 | 7 | – | 3 | – | 2 |
| LSU | 2 | – | 4 | – | 0 | 5 | – | 5 | – | 1 |
| Ole Miss | 0 | – | 6 | – | 0 | 3 | – | 8 | – | 0 |
$ – Conference champion; Rankings from AP Poll

The 1974 Kentucky Wildcats football team represented the University of Kentucky in the Southeastern Conference (SEC) during the 1974 NCAA Division I football season. The Wildcats scored 248 points while allowing 194 points, finishing 6–5 overall and 3–3 in the SEC.

Mike Fanuzzi and Tom Ehlers were chosen as team captains.

Kentucky opened with a 38–7 win at Virginia Tech, followed by a 16–3 road loss at West Virginia. A 28–22 home win against Indiana was next, then a 14–10 loss to Miami (Ohio).

Kentucky lost its SEC opener on the road at Auburn, 31–13, but followed with a 20–13 home win against LSU, the Wildcats' first victory vs. the Bayou Bengals since 1960. A 24–20 home loss to Georgia was followed by a 30–7 win at Tulane. Kentucky then won two conference games at home, 38–12 against Vanderbilt and 41–24 against #9-ranked Florida (7–2). Florida already received an invitation to the Sugar Bowl, while Kentucky, at 5–4, was looking to clinch its first winning season since 1965. Florida jumped out to a 17–6 lead but Kentucky outscored the Gators 35–7 the rest of the way, causing three Florida fumbles, intercepting two passes and blocking two punts. Kentucky closed its season with a 24–7 loss at Tennessee for a final mark of 6–5 overall and 3–3 in the SEC.

== Schedule ==
| Date | Opponent | Site | Result | Attendance | Source |
|---|---|---|---|---|---|
| September 14 | at Virginia Tech* | Lane Stadium; Blacksburg, VA | W 38–7 | 23,000 | |
| September 21 | at West Virginia* | Mountaineer Field; Morgantown, WV | L 3–16 | 28,200 | |
| September 28 | Indiana* | Commonwealth Stadium; Lexington, KY (rivalry) | W 28–22 | 56,000 | |
| October 5 | Miami (OH)* | Commonwealth Stadium; Lexington, KY | L 10–14 | 52,000 | |
| October 12 | at No. 10 Auburn | Jordan–Hare Stadium; Auburn, AL | L 13–31 | 52,111 | |
| October 19 | LSU | Commonwealth Stadium; Lexington, KY | W 20–13 | 57,000 | |
| October 26 | Georgia | Commonwealth Stadium; Lexington, KY | L 20–24 | 54,362 | |
| November 2 | at Tulane* | Tulane Stadium; New Orleans, LA | W 30–7 | 38,384 | |
| November 9 | Vanderbilt | Commonwealth Stadium; Lexington, KY (rivalry) | W 38–12 | 56,000 | |
| November 16 | No. 9 Florida | Commonwealth Stadium; Lexington, KY (rivalry) | W 41–24 | 45,000 | |
| November 23 | at Tennessee | Neyland Stadium; Knoxville, TN (rivalry) | L 7–24 | 72,828 | |
*Non-conference game; Rankings from AP Poll released prior to the game

== Roster ==
- DE Kevin Atcheson, So.
- RB Rich Alvey, Sr.
- OB Fabian Andriacchi, So.
- LB John Barrington, So.
- RB Bill Bartos, Jr.
- WR Bill Bauer, Sr.
- DE Andy Biggers, So.
- WR Fred Bishop, So.
- OT Ben Bransom, Sr.
- OT Warren Bryant, So.
- M Gary Buban, So.
- WR Randy Burke, So.
- DE Walt Burks, So.
- RB Steve Campassi, Jr.
- OT Bruce Carpenter, Jr.
- DB Ray Carr, So.
- M Mike Cassity, Sr.
- RB Sonny Collins, Jr.
- OT Dave Crea, So.
- OB Cary Curd, So.
- RB Joe Dipre, So.
- DT Pat Donley, Sr.
- LB David Duke, So.
- DE Bruce Edwards, So.
- LB Tom Ehlers, Sr.
- LB Mike Emanuel, Jr.
- QB Mike Fanuzzi, Sr.
- TE Tom Farmer, Sr.
- OT Mike Foster, Sr.
- OE Gil Foushee, So.
- DE Rick Fromm, Jr.
- OG Washington Gay, So.
- WR Pete Gemmill, So.
- DT Jeff Gray, Fr.
- WR Tony Gray, Jr.
- TE Karl Haff, So.
- DB Haley Ray, So.
- DE Terry Haynes, Jr.
- QB Cliff Hite, So.
- DB Craig Hower, So.
- DB Dave Jones, Fr.
- LB Kenneth Karish, So.
- DT Kevin Kelley, So.
- OG Randy Klinect, So
- OT John Koehler, So.
- TE Tom Kostelnik, Jr.
- QB Ernie Lewis, Sr.
- LB Steve Liddy, So.
- LB Ned Lidvall, Sr.
- DT Steve Lochmueller, Jr.
- LB Mike Martin, So.
- OB Mike McGrath, Jr.
- LB Jody McLoud, So.
- LB Dave Moitis, Jr.
- DT Jeff Morris, So.
- OG Steve Murgita, Sr.
- DE Bob Murray, So.
- OL Art Myers, Sr.
- C John Nochta, Jr.
- C Rick Nuzum , Sr.
- OL Tim O'Toole, So.
- LB Steve Parker, Sr.
- C Cephas Penn, So.
- OG Wally Persuit, Jr.
- DE Roger Peterman, Jr.
- N John Pierce, So.
- N Tom Ranieri, Jr.
- OT Mark Renfroe, So.
- QB Kent Reyes, So.
- LB Ches Riddle, Jr.
- RB Chuck Servino, So.
- OT Ed Singleton, So.
- OG Steve Slates, So.
- OG Ed Smolder, So.
- N-DT Paul Sponheimer, Sr.
- TE Elmore Stephens, Sr.
- WR-P John Tatterson, Sr.
- DB Ben Thomas, Sr.
- LB Jeff Thompson, Jr.
- WR Dave Trosper, So.
- M Danny Wilkerson, So.
- DT Bob Winkel, Fr.
- S Greg Woods, So.
- DL Jody Wright, So.

== Team players in the 1975 NFL draft ==
| Player | Position | Round | Pick | NFL club |
|---|---|---|---|---|
| Elmore Stephens | Tight end | 2 | 34 | Kansas City Chiefs |
| Rick Nuzum | Tackle | 5 | 126 | Los Angeles Rams |
| Tom Ehlers | Linebacker | 13 | 323 | Philadelphia Eagles |
