= Doug Nettles =

American football player (born 1951)

- Nettles in 1977

No. 30, 22
- Position: Cornerback

Personal information
- Born: August 13, 1951 (age 75); Panama City, Florida, U.S.
- Listed height: 6 ft 0 in (1.83 m)
- Listed weight: 179 lb (81 kg)

Career information
- High school: Rutherford (Panama City)
- College: Vanderbilt
- NFL draft: 1974: 5th round, 129th overall pick

Career history
- Baltimore Colts (1974–1979); New York Giants (1980)

Career NFL statistics
- Games played: 73
- Starts: 37
- Interceptions: 7
- Fumble recoveries: 5
- Stats at Pro Football Reference

Gordon Douglas Nettles (born August 13, 1951) is an American former professional football player who was a defensive back in the National Football League (NFL). He played college football for the Vanderbilt Commodores.

== Biography ==
Doug Nettles was born August 13, 1951 in Panama City, Florida in a military family. His father was stationed in Okinawa, the Philippines, and Morocco, and he spent much of his childhood in those locales. He attended Rutherford High School in Panama City, where he was recognized as a High School All-American running back.

Nettles played for seven seasons in the NFL.

Nettles played college football for the Commodores at Vanderbilt University, where he was one of the two African-Americans on the team, the other being Walt Overton. He was a member of the team that played in the 1974 Peach Bowl.

Nettles was selected in the 5th round of the 1974 NFL draft by the Baltimore Colts, who made him the 129th player selected that year. He would play for seven seasons in the National Football League for the Colts and the New York Giants, playing cornerback and special teams.

Nettles worked 18 years in medical sales. He was a fifth grade history teacher and fifth grade football coach until the end of the 2019 school year. He also coached lower school track at Landon School in Bethesda, Maryland.
