= 1974 Ole Miss Rebels football team =

American college football season

1974 Ole Miss Rebels football
- Conference: Southeastern Conference
- Record: 3–8 (0–6 SEC)
- Head coach: Ken Cooper (1st season)
- Home stadium: Hemingway Stadium; Mississippi Veterans Memorial Stadium

1974 Southeastern Conference football standings
	Conf.					Overall
Team	W		L		T	W		L		T
No. 5 Alabama $	6	–	0	–	0	11	–	1	–	0
No. 8 Auburn	4	–	2	–	0	10	–	2	–	0
Georgia	4	–	2	–	0	6	–	6	–	0
No. 17 Mississippi State	3	–	3	–	0	9	–	3	–	0
No. 15 Florida	3	–	3	–	0	8	–	4	–	0
Kentucky	3	–	3	–	0	6	–	5	–	0
No. 20 Tennessee	2	–	3	–	1	7	–	3	–	2
Vanderbilt	2	–	3	–	1	7	–	3	–	2
LSU	2	–	4	–	0	5	–	5	–	1
Ole Miss	0	–	6	–	0	3	–	8	–	0
$ – Conference champion; Rankings from AP Poll

The 1974 Ole Miss Rebels football team represented the University of Mississippi (Ole Miss) in the 1974 NCAA Division I football season. The Rebels were led by first-year head coach Ken Cooper and played their home games at Hemingway Stadium in Oxford, Mississippi and Mississippi Veterans Memorial Stadium in Jackson. The team competed as a member of the Southeastern Conference, finishing in last. The Rebels opened the season with an upset of Missouri, but the rest of the season went very poorly, as the team went winless in conference play and finished with a record of 3–8, the school's first losing season since 1949.

== Schedule ==
Date	Opponent	Site	Result	Attendance	Source
September 14	No. 18 Missouri*	Mississippi Veterans Memorial Stadium; Jackson, MS	W 10–0	38,500	
September 21	at Memphis State*	Memphis Memorial Stadium; Memphis, TN (rivalry)	L 7–15	50,164	
September 28	Southern Miss*	Hemingway Stadium; Oxford, MS	W 20–14	29,000	
October 5	No. 3 Alabama	Mississippi Veterans Memorial Stadium; Jackson, MS (rivalry)	L 21–35	45,500	
October 12	at Georgia	Sanford Stadium; Athens, GA	L 0–49	48,500	
October 19	South Carolina*	Hemingway Stadium; Oxford, MS	L 7–10	32,800	
October 26	at Vanderbilt	Dudley Field; Nashville, TN (rivalry)	L 14–24	30,875	
November 2	at LSU	Tiger Stadium; Baton Rouge, LA (rivalry)	L 0–24	66,728	
November 16	vs. Tennessee	Memphis Memorial Stadium; Memphis, TN (rivalry)	L 17–29	50,515	
November 23	vs. Mississippi State	Mississippi Veterans Memorial Stadium; Jackson, MS (Egg Bowl)	L 13–31	46,500	
November 30 (Note: The game against Tulane was originally scheduled for September 7, but was postponed to the end of the season due to the threat of Hurricane Carmen along the Louisiana coast.)	at Tulane*	Tulane Stadium; New Orleans, LA (rivalry)	W 26–10	21,628	
*Non-conference game; Rankings from AP Poll released prior to the game
