= 1974 LSU Tigers football team =

American college football season

1974 LSU Tigers football
- Conference: Southeastern Conference
- Record: 5–5–1 (2–4 SEC)
- Head coach: Charles McClendon (13th season)
- Home stadium: Tiger Stadium

1974 Southeastern Conference football standings
	Conf.					Overall
Team	W		L		T	W		L		T
No. 5 Alabama $	6	–	0	–	0	11	–	1	–	0
No. 8 Auburn	4	–	2	–	0	10	–	2	–	0
Georgia	4	–	2	–	0	6	–	6	–	0
No. 17 Mississippi State	3	–	3	–	0	9	–	3	–	0
No. 15 Florida	3	–	3	–	0	8	–	4	–	0
Kentucky	3	–	3	–	0	6	–	5	–	0
No. 20 Tennessee	2	–	3	–	1	7	–	3	–	2
Vanderbilt	2	–	3	–	1	7	–	3	–	2
LSU	2	–	4	–	0	5	–	5	–	1
Ole Miss	0	–	6	–	0	3	–	8	–	0
$ – Conference champion; Rankings from AP Poll

The 1974 LSU Tigers football team represented Louisiana State University (LSU) as a member of the Southeastern Conference (SEC) during the 1974 NCAA Division I football season. Led by 13th-year head coach Charles McClendon, the Tigers compiled an overall record of 5–5–1, with a mark of 2–4 in conference play, and finished ninth in the SEC.

== Schedule ==
Date	Opponent	Rank	Site	Result	Attendance	Source
September 14	Colorado*	No. 9	Tiger Stadium; Baton Rouge, LA	W 42–14	70,274	
September 21	Texas A&M*	No. 7	Tiger Stadium; Baton Rouge, LA (rivalry)	L 14–21	69,088	
September 28	at Rice*	No. 17	Rice Stadium; Houston, TX	T 10–10	55,000	
October 5	at No. 13 Florida		Florida Field; Gainesville, FL (rivalry)	L 14–24	56,590	
October 12	Tennessee^{†}		Tiger Stadium; Baton Rouge, LA	W 20–10	67,907	
October 19	at Kentucky		Commonwealth Stadium; Lexington, KY	L 13–20	57,000	
November 2	Ole Miss		Tiger Stadium; Baton Rouge, LA (rivalry)	W 24–0	66,728	
November 9	at Alabama		Legion Field; Birmingham, AL (rivalry)	L 0–30	70,364	
November 16	at Mississippi State		Mississippi Veterans Memorial Stadium; Jackson, MS (rivalry)	L 6–7	37,000	
November 23	Tulane*		Tiger Stadium; Baton Rouge, LA (Battle for the Rag)	W 24–22	66,017	
November 30	Utah*		Tiger Stadium; Baton Rouge, LA	W 35–10	55,573	
*Non-conference game; ^{†}Homecoming; Rankings from AP Poll released prior to the game

== Roster ==
1974 LSU Tigers football team roster
Players
Coaches
Offense

Pos.	#	Name	Class
TE	89	Brad Boyd	Sr
RB	48	Brad Davis	Sr
QB	5	Mike Miley	Sr
RB		Steve Rogers	Sr

Defense

Pos.	#	Name	Class
LB		Ken Bordelon	Jr
LB	80	Bo Harris	Sr
CB	29	Mike Williams	Sr

Special teams

Pos.	#	Name	Class

Head coach

- Charles McClendon

Coordinators/assistant coaches

Legend

- (C) Team captain
- (S) Suspended
- (I) Ineligible
- Injured
- Redshirt

Roster
