= 1974 NCAA Division I football season =

American college football season

- Preseason AP No. 1: Oklahoma
- Regular season: September 7 – November 30, 1974
- Number of bowls: 11
- Bowl games: December 16, 1974 – January 1, 1975
- Champion(s): Oklahoma (AP); USC (Coaches, FWAA, NFF)
- Heisman: Ohio State running back Archie Griffin

The 1974 NCAA Division I football season finished with two national champions. The Associated Press (AP) writers' poll ranked the University of Oklahoma, which was on probation and barred by the NCAA from postseason play, No. 1 at season's end. The United Press International (UPI) coaches' poll did not rank teams on probation, by unanimous agreement of the 25 member coaches' board. The UPI trophy went to USC.

During the 20th century, the NCAA had no playoff for the major college football teams, later known as "Division I-A". The NCAA Football Guide, however, did note an "unofficial national champion" based on the top ranked teams in the "wire service" (AP and UPI) polls. The "writers' poll" by Associated Press (AP) was the most popular, followed by the "coaches' poll" by United Press International) (UPI). Starting in 1974, the UPI joined AP in issuing its final poll after the bowl games were completed. Both polls operated under a point system of 20 points for first place, 19 for second, etc., whereby the overall ranking was determined. The AP poll consisted of the votes of 60 writers, though not all voted in each poll, and the UPI poll was taken of a 25-member board.

== Rule changes ==
- Blocking below the waist is prohibited on kickoffs, punts, or free kicks, and anywhere on the field except in a three-yard area around the line of scrimmage.
- Shoulder pads are required equipment for all players. Prior to this, kickers and wide receivers frequently played without shoulder pads.
- Penalty enforcement on running plays is from the end of the run except for fouls committed by the offense; those are penalized from the spot of the foul.
- Players who enter the field are required to remain for one play, and players who leave the field are required to stay on the bench for one play. This ended the practice of sending "messenger" players in to relay plays from the sideline, then leave the field without participating.
- Players leaving the bench to participate in touchdown celebrations will result in a five-yard penalty for the scoring team. If a coach joins in the celebration on the field, the penalty is 15 yards.
- Successful field goals now must travel between the uprights; previously a field goal was declared good if the ball went over an upright, the standard still used by the National Football League. This became a point of dispute in the 1974 Ohio State-Michigan game, as Michigan's game-winning field goal attempt was declared no good due to the ball going over the left upright. Michigan claimed the ball curled just inside the left upright.

== Conference and program changes ==
School	1973 Conference	1974 Conference
Cal State Los Angeles Golden Eagles	PCAA (D-I)	CCAA (D-II)
Cal State Fullerton Titans	CCAA (D-II)	PCAA (D-I)
Xavier Musketeers	Independent	Dropped Program

== September ==
In the preseason poll released on September 2, 1974, the AP ranked Oklahoma No. 1, followed by No. 2 Ohio State, No. 3 Notre Dame, No. 4 Alabama and No. 5 USC.

September 7: No. 3 Notre Dame, the defending national champion, beat Georgia Tech in Atlanta, 31–7, in a nationally televised game on Monday night, September 9. The few other schools playing that weekend included No. 11 Houston, which lost 30−9 to No. 15 Arizona State, and No. 12 UCLA, which tied No. 16 Tennessee 17−17. Elsewhere, the scheduled Ole Miss-Tulane game in New Orleans was postponed until November 30 due to the threat of Hurricane Carmen. The next poll featured No. 1 Oklahoma, No. 2 Notre Dame, No. 3 Alabama, No. 4 Ohio State, and No. 5 USC.

September 14: No. 1 Oklahoma beat Baylor, 28–11. No. 2 Notre Dame was idle. No. 3 Alabama won at No. 14 Maryland, 21–16. No. 4 Ohio State won at Minnesota, 34–19. No. 5 USC lost to No. 20 Arkansas in Little Rock, 22–7. No. 7 Nebraska, which beat Oregon in its opener, 61–7, moved up in the polls. There was considerable disagreement between AP voters at the top of the next poll, with 19 first-place votes going to Notre Dame, 18 to Oklahoma, and 17 to Ohio State. The top five were No. 1 Notre Dame, No. 2 Ohio State, No. 3 Oklahoma, No. 4 Nebraska, and No. 5 Alabama.

September 21: No. 1 Notre Dame won at Northwestern, 49–3. No. 2 Ohio State beat Oregon State 51–10. No. 3 Oklahoma was idle. No. 4 Nebraska lost at Wisconsin, 21–20. No. 5 Alabama beat Southern Mississippi at home, 52–0. No. 6 Michigan, which beat Colorado 31–0, replaced Nebraska in the top five. In the next poll, Notre Dame had the edge in first-place votes (26 to 23), but Ohio State took the lead based on overall points. No. 1 Ohio State and No. 2 Notre Dame were followed by No. 3 Oklahoma, No. 4 Alabama, and No. 5 Michigan.

September 28: No. 1 Ohio State defeated SMU, 28–9. No. 2 Notre Dame was upset at home by Purdue, 31–20. No. 3 Oklahoma rolled over visiting Utah State, 72–3. No. 4 Alabama beat Vanderbilt 23–10. No. 5 Michigan beat Navy, 52–0. Losses by the sixth- through eighth-ranked teams opened the door for No. 9 Texas A&M, which won at Washington 28–15, to move into the top five. The next poll featured No. 1 Ohio State, No. 2 Oklahoma, No. 3 Alabama, No. 4 Michigan, and No. 5 Texas A&M.

== October ==
October 5: No. 1 Ohio State beat Washington State 42–7 in Seattle. No. 2 Oklahoma shut out Wake Forest 63–0. No. 3 Alabama beat Mississippi at Jackson, 35–21. No. 4 Michigan won at Stanford, 27–16. No. 5 Texas A&M lost at Kansas, 28–10. No. 6 Nebraska, which beat Minnesota 54–0, moved up to No. 5 in the next poll, with the top four remaining the same.

October 12: No. 1 Ohio State beat visiting No. 13 Wisconsin 52–7. No. 2 Oklahoma barely defeated No. 17 Texas in Dallas, 16–13. No. 3 Alabama survived a game against winless (0–4) Florida State, winning 8–7. No. 4 Michigan beat Michigan State, 21–7. No. 5 Nebraska lost to Missouri 21–10 and was replaced in the next poll by No. 10 Auburn, which beat Kentucky 31–13. The poll featured No. 1 Ohio State, No. 2 Oklahoma, No. 3 Michigan, No. 4 Alabama, and No. 5 Auburn.

October 19: No. 1 Ohio State beat Indiana, 49–9. No. 2 Oklahoma won at Colorado, 49–14. No. 3 Michigan won at Wisconsin, 24–20. No. 4 Alabama won at Tennessee, 28–6. No. 5 Auburn beat Georgia Tech 31–22. The top five remained the same.

October 26: This week was defined by blowouts. No. 1 Ohio State won at Northwestern 55–7, No. 2 Oklahoma beat Kansas State 63–0, No. 3 Michigan beat Minnesota 49–0, No. 4 Alabama beat TCU 41–3 at Birmingham, and No. 5 Auburn beat Florida State 38–6. The top five again remained the same.

== November ==
November 2: No. 1 Ohio State defeated Illinois at home, 49–7. With a record of 8–0, the Buckeyes had outscored their opposition 360 to 75. No. 2 Oklahoma won at Iowa State, 28–10. No. 3 Michigan won at Indiana, 21–7. No. 4 Alabama beat No. 17 Mississippi State 35–0, and thereby jumped over Michigan in the next poll. No. 5 No. 5 Auburn lost at No. 11 Florida, 25–14. No. 8 Texas A&M, which beat Arkansas 20–10, returned to the Top Five: No. 1 Ohio State, No. 2 Oklahoma, No. 3 Alabama, No. 4 Michigan, and No. 5 Texas A&M.

November 9: In East Lansing, Michigan, No. 1 Ohio State was upset by unranked (and 4–3–1) Michigan State, 16–13. No. 2 Oklahoma, which had beaten Missouri 37–0, took the first spot. No. 3 Alabama beat LSU in Birmingham, 30–0. No. 4 Michigan won at Illinois, 14–6. No. 5 Texas A&M lost at SMU, 18–14. No. 8 No. 8 Notre Dame was idle but rose to fifth place after losses by No. 6 Florida and No. 7 Penn State. The top five were No. 1 Oklahoma, No. 2 Alabama, No. 3 Michigan, No. 4 Ohio State, and No. 5 Notre Dame.

November 16: No. 1 Oklahoma won at Kansas, 45–14. No. 2 Alabama won in Florida over Miami, 28–7, and No. 3 Michigan beat Purdue. All three teams were undefeated and untied. No. 4 Ohio State won at Iowa, 35–10, and No. 5 Notre Dame beat No. 17 Pittsburgh, 14–10. The top five remained the same.

November 23: No. 1 Oklahoma beat No. 6 Nebraska, 28–14. No. 2 Alabama was idle as it prepared for its season ender with Auburn. The latest battle of "The Ten Year War" took place in Columbus, Ohio, as No. 3 Michigan (10–0) met No. 4 Ohio State (9–1) in their annual clash for the Big Ten title. OSU won, 12–10, to clinch a third consecutive Rose Bowl berth. Over the previous three years, Michigan was 30−0 against all opponents other than Ohio State, but the Big Ten's rule that only the conference champion could participate in a bowl game kept the Wolverines out of the postseason each year. No. 5 Notre Dame beat Air Force, 38–0. No. 6 USC topped UCLA 34–9 for the Pac-8 title and the right to face Ohio State in the Rose Bowl. The next poll featured No. 1 Oklahoma, No. 2 Alabama, No. 3 Ohio State, No. 4 Michigan, and No. 5 Notre Dame.

November 29−30: The annual Alabama-Auburn game took place on a Friday night in Birmingham, with No. 2 Alabama winning 17–13 over No. 7 Auburn to close its season at 11–0. The next day, No. 1 Oklahoma won its annual season ender against Oklahoma State, 44–13, to also finish 11–0. With Oklahoma barred from the postseason due to NCAA probation, the Orange Bowl organizers had already arranged for Alabama to meet No. 5 Notre Dame in a rematch of last year's national championship game. However, the Fighting Irish still had one more regular season game left, against No. 6 USC in Los Angeles. After trailing 24–0, the Trojans scored 55 unanswered points and cruised to victory, keeping themselves in national championship contention and effectively eliminating Notre Dame. The final regular season AP Poll featured No. 1 Oklahoma, No. 2 Alabama, No. 3 Ohio State, No. 4 Michigan, and No. 5 USC. Since teams on probation were ineligible to be ranked in the coaches' poll, the UPI named Alabama as No. 1, followed by Ohio State, Michigan, USC, and Auburn.

In other action, Tulane lost its final game at Tulane Stadium 26–10 to Ole Miss. The Green Wave played 38 of their next 39 seasons at the Superdome, except for 2005, when they were forced to play all of their games away from New Orleans in the wake of Hurricane Katrina. Tulane returned to campus in 2014 when Yulman Stadium opened.

== Conference standings ==
1974 Atlantic Coast Conference football standings
	Conf.					Overall
Team	W		L		T	W		L		T
No. 13 Maryland $	6	–	0	–	0	8	–	4	–	0
No. 11 NC State	4	–	2	–	0	9	–	2	–	1
Clemson	4	–	2	–	0	7	–	4	–	0
North Carolina	4	–	2	–	0	7	–	5	–	0
Duke	2	–	4	–	0	6	–	5	–	0
Virginia	1	–	5	–	0	4	–	7	–	0
Wake Forest	0	–	6	–	0	1	–	10	–	0
$ – Conference champion; Rankings from AP Poll

1974 Big Eight Conference football standings
	Conf.					Overall
Team	W		L		T	W		L		T
No. 1 Oklahoma $	7	–	0	–	0	11	–	0	–	0
Missouri	5	–	2	–	0	7	–	4	–	0
No. 9 Nebraska	5	–	2	–	0	9	–	3	–	0
Oklahoma State	4	–	3	–	0	7	–	5	–	0
Colorado	3	–	4	–	0	5	–	6	–	0
Iowa State	2	–	5	–	0	4	–	7	–	0
Kansas	1	–	6	–	0	4	–	7	–	0
Kansas State	1	–	6	–	0	4	–	7	–	0
$ – Conference champion; Rankings from AP Poll

1974 Big Sky Conference football standings
	Conf.					Overall
Team	W		L		T	W		L		T
No. 5 Boise State $^	6	–	0	–	0	10	–	2	–	0
Montana State	4	–	2	–	0	7	–	3	–	0
Idaho	2	–	2	–	1	2	–	8	–	1
Montana	2	–	3	–	1	3	–	6	–	1
Northern Arizona	2	–	3	–	0	3	–	6	–	0
Idaho State	2	–	4	–	0	5	–	5	–	0
Weber State	1	–	5	–	0	4	–	7	–	0
$ – Conference champion; ^ – NCAA Division II playoff participant; Rankings from AP small college poll

1974 Big Ten Conference football standings
	Conf.					Overall
Team	W		L		T	W		L		T
No. 3 Michigan +	7	–	1	–	0	10	–	1	–	0
No. 4 Ohio State +	7	–	1	–	0	10	–	2	–	0
No. 12 Michigan State	6	–	1	–	1	7	–	3	–	1
Wisconsin	5	–	3	–	0	7	–	4	–	0
Illinois	4	–	3	–	1	6	–	4	–	1
Purdue	3	–	5	–	0	4	–	6	–	1
Minnesota	2	–	6	–	0	4	–	7	–	0
Iowa	2	–	6	–	0	3	–	8	–	0
Northwestern	2	–	6	–	0	3	–	8	–	0
Indiana	1	–	7	–	0	1	–	10	–	0
+ – Conference co-champions; Rankings from AP Poll

1974 Ivy League football standings
	Conf.					Overall
Team	W		L		T	W		L		T
Harvard +	6	–	1	–	0	7	–	2	–	0
Yale +	6	–	1	–	0	8	–	1	–	0
Penn	4	–	2	–	1	6	–	2	–	1
Brown	4	–	3	–	0	5	–	4	–	0
Dartmouth	3	–	4	–	0	3	–	6	–	0
Princeton	3	–	4	–	0	4	–	4	–	1
Cornell	1	–	5	–	1	3	–	5	–	1
Columbia	0	–	7	–	0	1	–	8	–	0
+ – Conference co-champions

1974 Mid-American Conference football standings
	Conf.					Overall
Team	W		L		T	W		L		T
No. 10 Miami (OH) $	5	–	0	–	0	10	–	0	–	1
Ohio	3	–	2	–	0	6	–	5	–	0
Toledo	3	–	2	–	0	6	–	5	–	0
Kent State	2	–	3	–	0	7	–	4	–	0
Bowling Green	2	–	3	–	0	6	–	4	–	1
Western Michigan	0	–	5	–	0	3	–	8	–	0
$ – Conference champion; Rankings from AP Poll

1974 Missouri Valley Conference football standings
	Conf.					Overall
Team	W		L		T	W		L		T
Tulsa $	6	–	0	–	0	8	–	3	–	0
Louisville	3	–	2	–	0	4	–	7	–	0
West Texas State	3	–	3	–	0	6	–	5	–	0
Drake	2	–	3	–	1	3	–	7	–	1
New Mexico State	2	–	3	–	0	5	–	6	–	0
North Texas State	1	–	3	–	2	2	–	7	–	2
Wichita State	1	–	4	–	1	1	–	9	–	1
$ – Conference champion

1974 Pacific Coast Athletic Association football standings
	Conf.					Overall
Team	W		L		T	W		L		T
San Diego State $	4	–	0	–	0	8	–	2	–	1
San Jose State	2	–	2	–	0	8	–	3	–	1
Pacific (CA)	2	–	2	–	0	6	–	5	–	0
Long Beach State	1	–	3	–	0	6	–	5	–	0
Fresno State	1	–	3	–	0	5	–	7	–	0
Cal State Fullerton	0	–	0	–	0	4	–	6	–	0
$ – Conference champion

1974 Pacific-8 Conference football standings
	Conf.					Overall
Team	W		L		T	W		L		T
No. 2 USC $	6	–	0	–	1	10	–	1	–	1
Stanford	5	–	1	–	1	5	–	4	–	2
California	4	–	2	–	1	7	–	3	–	1
UCLA	4	–	2	–	1	6	–	3	–	2
Washington	3	–	4	–	0	5	–	6	–	0
Oregon State	3	–	4	–	0	3	–	8	–	0
Washington State	1	–	6	–	0	2	–	9	–	0
Oregon	0	–	7	–	0	2	–	9	–	0
$ – Conference champion; Rankings from AP Poll

1974 Southern Conference football standings
	Conf.					Overall
Team	W		L		T	W		L		T
VMI $	5	–	1	–	0	7	–	4	–	0
Appalachian State	4	–	1	–	0	6	–	5	–	0
East Carolina	3	–	3	–	0	7	–	4	–	0
Richmond	3	–	3	–	0	5	–	5	–	0
The Citadel	3	–	4	–	0	4	–	7	–	0
William & Mary	2	–	3	–	0	4	–	7	–	0
Furman	2	–	4	–	0	5	–	6	–	0
Davidson	0	–	3	–	0	2	–	7	–	0
$ – Conference champion

1974 Southeastern Conference football standings
	Conf.					Overall
Team	W		L		T	W		L		T
No. 5 Alabama $	6	–	0	–	0	11	–	1	–	0
No. 8 Auburn	4	–	2	–	0	10	–	2	–	0
Georgia	4	–	2	–	0	6	–	6	–	0
No. 17 Mississippi State	3	–	3	–	0	9	–	3	–	0
No. 15 Florida	3	–	3	–	0	8	–	4	–	0
Kentucky	3	–	3	–	0	6	–	5	–	0
No. 20 Tennessee	2	–	3	–	1	7	–	3	–	2
Vanderbilt	2	–	3	–	1	7	–	3	–	2
LSU	2	–	4	–	0	5	–	5	–	1
Ole Miss	0	–	6	–	0	3	–	8	–	0
$ – Conference champion; Rankings from AP Poll

1974 Southwest Conference football standings
	Conf.					Overall
Team	W		L		T	W		L		T
No. 14 Baylor $	6	–	1	–	0	8	–	4	–	0
No. 17 Texas	5	–	2	–	0	8	–	4	–	0
No. 16 Texas A&M	5	–	2	–	0	8	–	3	–	0
Arkansas	3	–	3	–	1	6	–	4	–	1
SMU	3	–	3	–	1	6	–	4	–	1
Texas Tech	3	–	4	–	0	6	–	4	–	2
Rice	2	–	5	–	0	2	–	8	–	1
TCU	0	–	7	–	0	1	–	10	–	0
$ – Conference champion; Rankings from AP Poll

1974 Western Athletic Conference football standings
	Conf.					Overall
Team	W		L		T	W		L		T
BYU $	6	–	0	–	1	7	–	4	–	1
Arizona	6	–	1	–	0	9	–	2	–	0
Arizona State	4	–	3	–	0	7	–	5	–	0
New Mexico	3	–	4	–	0	4	–	6	–	1
UTEP	3	–	4	–	0	4	–	7	–	0
Colorado State	2	–	3	–	1	4	–	6	–	1
Utah	1	–	5	–	0	1	–	10	–	0
Wyoming	1	–	6	–	0	2	–	9	–	0
$ – Conference champion

1974 NCAA Division I independents football records
	Conf.			Overall
Team	W	L	T	W		L		T
No. 6 Notre Dame		–		10	–	2	–	0
No. 7 Penn State		–		10	–	2	–	0
Temple		–		8	–	2	–	0
Boston College		–		8	–	3	–	0
Utah State		–		8	–	3	–	0
No. 19 Houston		–		8	–	3	–	1
Rutgers		–		7	–	3	–	1
Cincinnati		–		7	–	4	–	0
Memphis State		–		7	–	4	–	0
Pittsburgh		–		7	–	4	–	0
Georgia Tech		–		6	–	5	–	0
Hawaii		–		6	–	5	–	0
Miami (FL)		–		6	–	5	–	0
Southern Miss		–		6	–	5	–	0
Tampa		–		6	–	5	–	0
Holy Cross		–		5	–	5	–	1
Tulane		–		5	–	6	–	0
Colgate		–		4	–	6	–	0
Northern Illinois		–		4	–	7	–	0
Navy		–		4	–	7	–	0
South Carolina		–		4	–	7	–	0
Virginia Tech		–		4	–	7	–	0
West Virginia		–		4	–	7	–	0
Army		–		3	–	8	–	0
Dayton		–		3	–	8	–	0
Villanova		–		3	–	8	–	0
Air Force		–		2	–	9	–	0
Southern Illinois		–		2	–	9	–	0
Syracuse		–		2	–	9	–	0
Florida State		–		1	–	10	–	0
Marshall		–		1	–	10	–	0
Rankings from AP Poll

== Bowl games ==
Tuesday, December 31, 1974

Wednesday, January 1, 1975

=== Major bowls ===
BOWL				
COTTON	No. 7 Penn State Nittany Lions	41	No. 12 Baylor Bears	20
SUGAR	No. 8 Nebraska Cornhuskers	13	No. 18 Florida Gators	10
ROSE	No. 5 USC Trojans	18	No. 3 Ohio State Buckeyes	17
ORANGE	No. 9 Notre Dame Fighting Irish	13	No. 2 Alabama Crimson Tide	11

Nebraska erased a 10-point deficit by defeating Florida in the Sugar Bowl played on New Year's Eve. The following afternoon, Penn State defeated the surprise SWC champion Baylor in the Cotton Bowl. Third-ranked Ohio State (led by Woody Hayes) and No. 5 USC (coached by John McKay) played in the Rose Bowl before a crowd of 106,721 in Pasadena. Ohio State led 7–3 after three quarters, and 17–10 in the closing minutes. With 2:03 left, Pat Haden fired a 38-yard pass to John McKay Jr. (son of USC's coach) to make the score 17–16. Coach McKay then passed up a chance for a tie over the favored Buckeyes, and ordered the Trojans to go for two. Shelton Diggs dove and caught Haden's low pass in the end zone to give USC an 18–17 lead. Ohio State could only get close enough for a desperation 62-yard field goal attempt that fell about 8 yards short as time expired.

Alabama, coached by Bear Bryant was ranked No. 1 in the UPI poll, and No. 2 (behind on-probation Oklahoma) in the AP, as it went to the Orange Bowl, where it faced 9th ranked Notre Dame, playing its final game under Ara Parseghian. The Irish went out to a 13–0 lead early in the game, but the Crimson Tide battled back with a field goal, a touchdown and a two-point run to close the score to 13–11 with three minutes left. After ruling out an onside kick attempt, the Tide force a Notre Dame punt and got the ball back with 1:37 left. Quarterback Richard Todd attempted to drive the team into field goal range, but he threw his 3rd interception of the game, and Notre Dame ran out the clock to preserve the upset win.

In the final polls, USC was ranked first by UPI, followed by Alabama, Ohio State, Michigan, and Notre Dame. The Trojans were second in the AP poll, where the Oklahoma Sooners were the first place choice for 51 of the 60 writers. The NCAA recognized both the Sooners and the Trojans as champions in its football guide.

=== Other bowls ===
BOWL	City	State	Date	Winner	Score	Runner-up
SUN	El Paso	Texas	December 28	Mississippi State	26–24	North Carolina
GATOR	Jacksonville	Florida	December 30	No. 6 Auburn	27–3	No. 11 Texas
TANGERINE	Orlando	Florida	December 21	No. 15 Miami (Ohio)	21–10	Georgia
ASTRO-BLUEBONNET	Houston	Texas	December 23	Houston (tie)	31–31	No. 13 N.C. State (tie)
LIBERTY	Memphis	Tennessee	December 16	Tennessee	7–3	No. 10 Maryland
PEACH	Atlanta	Georgia	December 28	Texas Tech (tie)	6–6	Vanderbilt (tie)
FIESTA	Tempe	Arizona	December 28	Oklahoma State	16–6	No. 17 BYU

== Heisman Trophy voting ==
The Heisman Trophy is given to the year's most outstanding player

Player	School	Position	1st	2nd	3rd	Total
Archie Griffin	Ohio State	RB	483	198	75	1,920
Anthony Davis	USC	RB	120	148	163	819
Joe Washington	Oklahoma	RB	87	146	108	661
Tom Clements	Notre Dame	QB	26	49	68	244
David Humm	Nebraska	QB	23	46	49	210
Dennis Franklin	Michigan	QB	6	30	22	100
Rod Shoate	Oklahoma	LB	12	16	29	97
Gary Sheide	BYU	QB	12	19	16	90
Randy White	Maryland	DT	9	20	18	85
Steve Bartkowski	California	QB	6	13	20	64

== See also ==
- 1974 NCAA Division I football rankings
- 1974 College Football All-America Team
- 1974 NCAA Division II football season
- 1974 NCAA Division III football season
