= 1974 Vanderbilt Commodores football team =

American college football season

1974 Vanderbilt Commodores football

Peach Bowl, T 6–6 vs. Texas Tech
- Conference: Southeastern Conference
- Record: 7–3–2 (2–3–1 SEC)
- Head coach: Steve Sloan (2nd season)
- Offensive coordinator: Rex Dockery (2nd season)
- Defensive coordinator: Bill Parcells (2nd season)
- Captain: David Lee
- Home stadium: Dudley Field

1974 Southeastern Conference football standings
	Conf.					Overall
Team	W		L		T	W		L		T
No. 5 Alabama $	6	–	0	–	0	11	–	1	–	0
No. 8 Auburn	4	–	2	–	0	10	–	2	–	0
Georgia	4	–	2	–	0	6	–	6	–	0
No. 17 Mississippi State	3	–	3	–	0	9	–	3	–	0
No. 15 Florida	3	–	3	–	0	8	–	4	–	0
Kentucky	3	–	3	–	0	6	–	5	–	0
No. 20 Tennessee	2	–	3	–	1	7	–	3	–	2
Vanderbilt	2	–	3	–	1	7	–	3	–	2
LSU	2	–	4	–	0	5	–	5	–	1
Ole Miss	0	–	6	–	0	3	–	8	–	0
$ – Conference champion; Rankings from AP Poll

The 1974 Vanderbilt Commodores football team represented Vanderbilt University in the 1974 NCAA Division I football season. The Commodores scored 313 points while allowing 199 points. Led by head coach Steve Sloan, the Commodores had their best record since 1955 and appeared in the school's second bowl game. Vanderbilt did not return to a bowl game until 1982.

Vanderbilt defeated Florida, Ole Miss, Tulane, Louisville, Army, Chattanooga, and the Virginia Military Institute. Vanderbilt lost to Kentucky, Georgia, and Alabama. Vanderbilt's final two games ended in ties: the regular season finale against rival Tennessee and the 1974 Peach Bowl against Texas Tech. Vanderbilt's final record was 7–3–2 (2–3–1 in the SEC). After the season, head coach Steve Sloan left Vanderbilt to become head coach at Texas Tech, the team Vanderbilt had faced in the Peach Bowl to close the season.

== Schedule ==
Date	Opponent	Site	TV	Result	Attendance	Source
September 14	Chattanooga*	Dudley Field; Nashville, TN		W 28–6	19,900	
September 21	VMI*	Dudley Field; Nashville, TN		W 45–7	16,500	
September 28	at No. 4 Alabama	Denny Stadium; Tuscaloosa, AL		L 10–23	58,419	
October 12	No. 8 Florida	Dudley Field; Nashville, TN		W 24–10	25,800	
October 19	at Georgia	Sanford Stadium; Athens, GA (rivalry)		L 31–38	51,100	
October 26	Ole Miss	Dudley Field; Nashville, TN (rivalry)		W 24–14	30,875	
November 2	at Army*	Michie Stadium; West Point, NY		W 38–14	30,109	
November 9	at Kentucky	Commonwealth Stadium; Lexington, KY (rivalry)		L 12–38	56,000	
November 16	Tulane*	Dudley Field; Nashville, TN		W 30–22	15,000	
November 23	at Louisville*	Fairgrounds Stadium; Louisville, KY		W 44–0	8,936	
November 30	Tennessee	Dudley Field; Nashville, TN (rivalry)		T 21–21	35,300	
December 28	vs. Texas Tech*	Atlanta Stadium; Atlanta, GA (Peach Bowl)	ABC	T 6–6	31,695	
*Non-conference game; Rankings from AP Poll released prior to the game

== Team players drafted into the NFL ==
Player	Position	Round	Pick	NFL club
Mark Ilgenfritz	Defensive end	5	118	Cleveland Browns
Doug Nettles	Defensive end	5	129	Baltimore Colts
