= 1974 Georgia Bulldogs football team =

American college football season

1974 Georgia Bulldogs football

Tangerine Bowl, L 10–21 vs. Miami (OH)
- Conference: Southeastern Conference
- Record: 6–6 (4–2 SEC)
- Head coach: Vince Dooley (11th season)
- Defensive coordinator: Erk Russell (11th season)
- Home stadium: Sanford Stadium

1974 Southeastern Conference football standings
	Conf.					Overall
Team	W		L		T	W		L		T
No. 5 Alabama $	6	–	0	–	0	11	–	1	–	0
No. 8 Auburn	4	–	2	–	0	10	–	2	–	0
Georgia	4	–	2	–	0	6	–	6	–	0
No. 17 Mississippi State	3	–	3	–	0	9	–	3	–	0
No. 15 Florida	3	–	3	–	0	8	–	4	–	0
Kentucky	3	–	3	–	0	6	–	5	–	0
No. 20 Tennessee	2	–	3	–	1	7	–	3	–	2
Vanderbilt	2	–	3	–	1	7	–	3	–	2
LSU	2	–	4	–	0	5	–	5	–	1
Ole Miss	0	–	6	–	0	3	–	8	–	0
$ – Conference champion; Rankings from AP Poll

The 1974 Georgia Bulldogs football team represented the University of Georgia as a member of the Southeastern Conference (SEC) during the 1974 NCAA Division I football season. Led by 11th-year head coach Vince Dooley, the Bulldogs compiled an overall record of 6–6, with a mark of 4–2 in conference play, and finished tied for second in the SEC.

== Schedule ==
Date	Opponent	Site	TV	Result	Attendance	Source
September 14	Oregon State*	Sanford Stadium; Athens, GA		W 48–35	42,200	
September 21	at Mississippi State	Mississippi Veterans Memorial Stadium; Jackson, MS		L 14–38	38,077	
September 28	South Carolina*	Sanford Stadium; Athens, GA (rivalry)		W 52–14	50,200	
October 5	at Clemson*	Memorial Stadium; Clemson, SC (rivalry)		L 24–28	42,933	
October 12	Ole Miss	Sanford Stadium; Athens, GA		W 49–0	48,500	
October 19	Vanderbilt^{†}	Sanford Stadium; Athens, GA (rivalry)		W 38–31	51,100	
October 26	at Kentucky	Commonwealth Stadium; Lexington, KY		W 24–20	54,362	
November 2	Houston*	Sanford Stadium; Athens, GA		L 24–31	48,100	
November 9	vs. No. 6 Florida	Gator Bowl Stadium; Jacksonville, FL (rivalry)		W 17–16	70,716	
November 16	at No. 7 Auburn	Jordan-Hare Stadium; Auburn, AL (rivalry)		L 13–17	64,748	
November 30	Georgia Tech*	Sanford Stadium; Athens, GA (rivalry)		L 14–34	47,500	
December 21	vs. No. 15 Miami (OH)*	Tangerine Bowl; Orlando, FL (Tangerine Bowl)	Mizlou	L 10–21	20,246	
*Non-conference game; ^{†}Homecoming; Rankings from AP Poll released prior to the game

== Roster ==
1974 Georgia Bulldogs football team roster
Players			Coaches
Offense: Pos. / # / Name / Class; QB / / Matt Robinson	Defense: Pos. / # / Name / Class; LB / / Ben Zambiasi / Fr	Special teams: Pos. / # / Name / Class; K / / Allan Leavitt / So	Head coach: Vince Dooley; Coordinators/assistant coaches: Erk Russell (DC); Legend: (C) Team captain; (S) Suspended; (I) Ineligible; Injured; Redshirt
