= Alabama–Mississippi State football rivalry =

American college football rivalry

- Alabama Crimson Tide Mississippi State Bulldogs
- First meeting: November 14, 1896; Alabama, 20–0
- Latest meeting: October 3, 2026; Alabama, 56–23
- Next meeting: 2027

Statistics
- Total meetings: 109
- All-time series: 87–18–3; Alabama leads 89–17–3 on the field, but two wins were vacated or forfeited. (Note: Alabama forfeited a game in 1993 that officially results in a Mississippi State win instead of an Alabama loss. Alabama vacated the game in 2005, which results in removal of the game from Alabama's win column, but not an added win for Mississippi State.)
- Largest victory: Alabama, 59–0 (1922)
- Longest win streak: Alabama, 22 (1958–1979)
- Current win streak: Alabama, 17 (2008–present)

Locations along Highway 82

The Alabama–Mississippi State football rivalry, also known as the 90 Mile Drive or the Battle for Highway 82, is an American college football rivalry between the Alabama Crimson Tide football team of the University of Alabama and Mississippi State Bulldogs football team of Mississippi State University. Both universities are founding members of the Southeastern Conference (SEC). The two campuses are located approximately 90 miles apart and are the two geographically closest SEC universities.

In 1935, MSU Coach Major Ralph Sasse, on "orders" from his team, went to Memphis, Tennessee, to select the first bulldog mascot. Ptolemy, a gift of the Edgar Webster family, was chosen and the Bulldogs promptly defeated Alabama 20–7.

Alabama–Mississippi State is one of the Southeastern Conference's longest-running series, dating back to 1896. Mississippi State is Alabama's most played opponent, while Alabama is MSU's third most played team behind Ole Miss and LSU. Aside from the Alabama–Ole Miss football rivalry, it also has been one of the league's most lopsided with Alabama leading the series 87–18–3.

== Notable games ==
- 1940: #11 Mississippi State, 8–0–1 on the season, defeated the 7–1 #17 Crimson Tide 13–0 in Tuscaloosa. The Bulldogs forced 5 turnovers on downs and remained undefeated on the season.
- 1941: The Maroons defeated Alabama in Tuscaloosa in September 14–0 on their way to winning the school's only football SEC Championship. Despite Mississippi State's head-to-head win and conference title, and the fact that Alabama finished #20 in the final AP Poll, Alabama claims a national championship for this season. This has led to many Mississippi State fans and bloggers to clamor for the Bulldogs, who finished 16th in the final poll, to claim the title as well.
- 1956: The Crimson Tide snapped a 20-game winless streak by defeating the Maroons 13–12 in Tuscaloosa.
- 1974: 7–0 Alabama, ranked #4 at the time and the eventual SEC Champion, defeated 6–1 and #17 Mississippi State in a 35–0 rout in Tuscaloosa.
- 1976: The 6–1 Bulldogs, ranked #18, traveled to Tuscaloosa to face the 5–2 and #17 Crimson Tide, where Alabama won 34–17. Had the Bulldogs won, they would have later had to forfeit anyway.
- 1980: In what is often named the biggest win in Mississippi State football history, the Bulldogs upset the #1 and two-time defending national champion Crimson Tide 6–3 in Jackson, snapping Alabama's 28-game winning streak and 22-game winning streak in the series. The Bulldogs held the prolific Tide wishbone offense to 116 yards on the ground, one third of its season average up to that point. Trailing 6–3 in the final minute, Alabama drove to the MSU 4-yard-line before a big hit from Bulldog linebacker Tyrone Keys jarred the football loose, sealing the upset win for the Bulldogs. After the game, Alabama coach Bear Bryant visited the Mississippi State locker room to congratulate the team for the win. In 2007, College Football News' Pete Futiak named the game the 91st best ending in college football history since 1970.
- 1981: #8 Alabama avenged its loss from the previous year by defeating the #7 Bulldogs 13–10 in Tuscaloosa in the only top-10 matchup between the two teams until 2014.
- 1986: #8 Alabama, coming off a loss to Penn State the week before, traveled to Starkville for the first time since 1960 to take on the #19 Bulldogs. The Tide won a dominating 38–3 victory, outgaining the Bulldogs by nearly 400 yards. Bobby Humphrey rushed for a then-school-record 284 yards.
- 1996: Alabama, 8–1 and ranked #10, fell to the 3–5 Bulldogs 17–16 in Starkville, giving Mississippi State head coach Jackie Sherrill his first win over his alma mater Alabama. Alabama, who missed an extra point earlier in the game, drove to the Mississippi State 39-yard line in the final minute but turned the ball over on downs. Alabama went on to win the SEC West anyway.
- 1999: The Bulldogs, 8–0 and ranked #8, traveled to Tuscaloosa to take on the 7–2 #11 Crimson Tide, looking for their fourth straight win in the series. However, Alabama defeated MSU 19–7, aided by three turnovers, a blocked punt, and what Mississippi State fans considered to be a pair of "questionable" holding penalties. The win clinched the SEC West for the Crimson Tide and ended the Bulldogs' bid for their second undefeated season.
- 2006: Mississippi State traveled to Tuscaloosa looking for its first SEC win of the season, while Alabama came in at 6–3. The game featured a pick-6 by each defense, and the Bulldogs stuffed Tide quarterback John Parker Wilson just outside the goal line to end the first half. Anthony Dixon ran for 121 yards, and the Bulldog defense held the Tide out of the end zone in the second half to seal the upset win.
- 2007: The Bulldogs clinched their first bowl bid in 7 years by beating #21 Alabama 17–12. The Bulldog defense held the Tide out of the end zone the entire game, and cornerback Anthony Johnson returned John Parker Wilson's intercepted pass for 100 yards and a touchdown with 4 seconds to go in the first half.
- 2012: The Bulldogs traveled to Tuscaloosa with a #13 ranking and a 7–0 record, hoping to knock off defending national champion and #1-ranked Alabama. In the buildup to the game, Mississippi State fans used Twitter to display "#WeBelieve 8–0" messages from all over the world, even including the Bear Bryant statue outside Bryant–Denny Stadium, and many bloggers declared it to be the biggest game in Mississippi State's history. However, the game did not live up to the hype—Alabama won handily, 38–7, holding the Bulldogs to only 47 rushing yards.
- 2014: The Bulldogs, undefeated and ranked #1 for the first time in school history, traveled to Tuscaloosa to face the 8–1 #5 Crimson Tide. Mississippi State had earned the #1 spot in all polls including the new College Football Playoff Rankings after defeating three top–10 teams in a row (#8 LSU, #6 Texas A&M, and #2 Auburn). The 99th game of the series between the two schools was considered by many to be the biggest game of the rivalry. After getting their opening points by tackling running back Josh Robinson in the Bulldogs' own endzone for a safety, Alabama went on to defeat the Bulldogs 25–20. Mississippi State quarterback Dak Prescott, who had been considered a Heisman Trophy frontrunner for much of the 2014 season, became the conference leader in interceptions after throwing three picks during this game.
- 2017: The 16th ranked Bulldogs took on #2 Alabama on a crazy night where two of the top three teams in the CFP Rankings lost (#1 Georgia and #3 Notre Dame). Alabama ended up rallying from a fourth quarter deficit due to a Jalen Hurts 26-yard TD pass to DeVonta Smith with 25 seconds remaining and the Tide survived in a 31–24 thriller.

== Game results ==
Alabama victories	Mississippi State victories	Tie games	Forfeits / Vacated wins (Note: Alabama's 1993 victory was forfeited as the NCAA found Antonio Langham guilty of receiving improper benefits after signing with an agent following the 1992 season, forcing Alabama to forfeit all games in which Langham competed.) (Note: Alabama's 2005 victory was vacated as part of NCAA sanctions.)

No.	Date	Location	Winning team		Losing team	
1	November 14, 1896	Tuscaloosa, AL	Alabama	20	Mississippi State	0
2	November 16, 1901	Tuscaloosa, AL	Alabama	45	Mississippi State	0
3	November 8, 1902	Tuscaloosa, AL	Alabama	27	Mississippi State	0
4	October 16, 1903	Columbus, MS	Mississippi A&M	11	Alabama	0
5	October 15, 1904	Columbus, MS	Alabama	6	Mississippi State	0
6	October 14, 1905	Tuscaloosa, AL	Alabama	34	Mississippi State	0
7	November 3, 1906	Starkville, MS	Alabama	16	Mississippi State	4
8	October 21, 1911	Columbus, MS	Tie	6	Tie	6
9	October 18, 1912	Aberdeen, MS	Mississippi A&M	7	Alabama	0
10	November 27, 1913	Birmingham, AL	Mississippi A&M	7	Alabama	0
11	November 26, 1914	Birmingham, AL	Mississippi A&M	9	Alabama	0
12	November 27, 1919	Birmingham, AL	Alabama	14	Mississippi State	6
13	November 25, 1920	Birmingham, AL	Alabama	24	Mississippi State	7
14	November 24, 1921	Birmingham, AL	Tie	7	Tie	7
15	November 30, 1922	Birmingham, AL	Alabama	59	Mississippi State	0
16	October 31, 1925	Tuscaloosa, AL	Alabama	6	Mississippi State	0
17	October 9, 1926	Meridian, MS	Alabama	26	Mississippi State	7
18	October 29, 1927	Tuscaloosa, AL	Alabama	13	Mississippi State	7
19	October 13, 1928	Starkville, MS	Alabama	46	Mississippi State	0
20	October 10, 1931	Meridian, MS	Alabama	53	Mississippi State	0
21	October 1, 1932	Montgomery, AL	Alabama	53	Mississippi State	0
22	October 14, 1933	Tuscaloosa, AL	Alabama	18	Mississippi State	0
23	October 13, 1934	Tuscaloosa, AL	Alabama	41	Mississippi State	0
24	October 12, 1935	Tuscaloosa, AL	Mississippi State	20	Alabama	7
25	October 10, 1936	Tuscaloosa, AL	Alabama	7	Mississippi State	0
26	October 28, 1939	Tuscaloosa, AL	#20 Alabama	7	Mississippi State	0
27	November 30, 1940	Tuscaloosa, AL	#11 Mississippi State	13	Alabama	0
28	October 4, 1941	Tuscaloosa, AL	Mississippi State	14	Alabama	0
29	October 3, 1942	Tuscaloosa, AL	Alabama	21	Mississippi State	6
30	November 18, 1944	Tuscaloosa, AL	Alabama	19	Mississippi State	0
31	December 1, 1945	Tuscaloosa, AL	#3 Alabama	55	Mississippi State	13
32	November 30, 1946	Tuscaloosa, AL	Alabama	24	Mississippi State	7
33	October 23, 1948	Starkville, MS	Alabama	10	Mississippi State	7
34	October 22, 1949	Tuscaloosa, AL	Alabama	35	Mississippi State	6
35	October 28, 1950	Tuscaloosa, AL	Alabama	14	Mississippi State	7
36	October 27, 1951	Starkville, MS	Alabama	7	Mississippi State	0
37	October 25, 1952	Tuscaloosa, AL	Alabama	42	Mississippi State	19
38	October 24, 1953	Tuscaloosa, AL	Tie	7	Tie	7
39	October 23, 1954	Tuscaloosa, AL	Mississippi State	12	Alabama	7
40	October 22, 1955	Tuscaloosa, AL	Mississippi State	26	Alabama	7
41	October 27, 1956	Tuscaloosa, AL	Alabama	13	Mississippi State	12
42	October 26, 1957	Tuscaloosa, AL	Mississippi State	25	Alabama	13
43	October 25, 1958	Starkville, MS	Alabama	9	Mississippi State	7
44	October 31, 1959	Tuscaloosa, AL	Alabama	10	Mississippi State	0
45	October 29, 1960	Starkville, MS	Alabama	7	Mississippi State	0
46	November 4, 1961	Tuscaloosa, AL	#4 Alabama	24	Mississippi State	0
47	November 3, 1962	Starkville, MS	#2 Alabama	20	Mississippi State	0
48	November 2, 1963	Tuscaloosa, AL	#7 Alabama	20	Mississippi State	19
49	October 31, 1964	Jackson, MS	#3 Alabama	23	Mississippi State	6
50	October 30, 1965	Jackson, MS	#10 Alabama	10	Mississippi State	7
51	October 29, 1966	Tuscaloosa, AL	#4 Alabama	27	Mississippi State	14
52	November 4, 1967	Tuscaloosa, AL	Alabama	13	Mississippi State	0
53	November 2, 1968	Tuscaloosa, AL	Alabama	20	Mississippi State	13
54	November 1, 1969	Jackson, MS	Alabama	23	Mississippi State	19
55	October 31, 1970	Tuscaloosa, AL	Alabama	35	Mississippi State	6
56	October 30, 1971	Jackson, MS	#4 Alabama	41	Mississippi State	10

No.	Date	Location	Winning team		Losing team	
57	November 4, 1972	Tuscaloosa, AL	#2 Alabama	58	Mississippi State	14
58	November 3, 1973	Jackson, MS	#2 Alabama	35	Mississippi State	0
59	November 2, 1974	Tuscaloosa, AL	#4 Alabama	35	Mississippi State	0
60	November 1, 1975	Jackson, MS	#6 Alabama	21	Mississippi State	10
61	October 30, 1976	Tuscaloosa, AL	#17 Alabama	34	Mississippi State	17
62	October 29, 1977	Jackson, MS	#2 Alabama	37	Mississippi State	7
63	November 4, 1978	Birmingham, AL	#3 Alabama	35	Mississippi State	14
64	November 3, 1979	Tuscaloosa, AL	#1 Alabama	24	Mississippi State	7
65	November 1, 1980	Jackson, MS	Mississippi State	6	Alabama	3
66	October 31, 1981	Tuscaloosa, AL	#8 Alabama	13	Mississippi State	10
67	October 30, 1982	Jackson, MS	#9 Alabama	20	Mississippi State	12
68	October 29, 1983	Tuscaloosa, AL	#18 Alabama	35	Mississippi State	18
69	November 3, 1984	Jackson, MS	Alabama	24	Mississippi State	20
70	November 2, 1985	Tuscaloosa, AL	Alabama	44	Mississippi State	28
71	November 1, 1986	Starkville, MS	#8 Alabama	38	Mississippi State	3
72	October 31, 1987	Birmingham, AL	#16 Alabama	21	Mississippi State	18
73	October 29, 1988	Starkville, MS	#19 Alabama	53	Mississippi State	34
74	November 4, 1989	Birmingham, AL	#4 Alabama	23	Mississippi State	10
75	November 3, 1990	Starkville, MS	Alabama	22	Mississippi State	0
76	November 2, 1991	Tuscaloosa, AL	#7 Alabama	13	Mississippi State	7
77	November 14, 1992	Starkville, MS	#2 Alabama	30	Mississippi State	21
78	November 13, 1993	Tuscaloosa, AL	Alabama†	36	Mississippi State	25
79	November 12, 1994	Starkville, MS	#6 Alabama	29	Mississippi State	25
80	November 11, 1995	Tuscaloosa, AL	#16 Alabama	14	Mississippi State	9
81	November 16, 1996	Starkville, MS	Mississippi State	17	Alabama	16
82	November 15, 1997	Tuscaloosa, AL	#17 Mississippi State	32	Alabama	20
83	November 14, 1998	Starkville, MS	Mississippi State	26	Alabama	14
84	November 13, 1999	Tuscaloosa, AL	#11 Alabama	19	Mississippi State	7
85	November 11, 2000	Starkville, MS	#15 Mississippi State	29	Alabama	7
86	November 10, 2001	Tuscaloosa, AL	Alabama	24	Mississippi State	17
87	November 9, 2002	Tuscaloosa, AL	#11 Alabama	28	Mississippi State	14
88	November 8, 2003	Starkville, MS	Alabama	38	Mississippi State	0
89	November 6, 2004	Tuscaloosa, AL	Alabama	30	Mississippi State	14
90	November 5, 2005	Starkville, MS	#4 Alabama^{‡}	17	Mississippi State	0
91	November 4, 2006	Tuscaloosa, AL	Mississippi State	24	Alabama	16
92	November 10, 2007	Starkville, MS	Mississippi State	17	Alabama	12
93	November 15, 2008	Tuscaloosa, AL	#1 Alabama	32	Mississippi State	7
94	November 14, 2009	Starkville, MS	#3 Alabama	31	Mississippi State	3
95	November 13, 2010	Tuscaloosa, AL	#11 Alabama	30	#17 Mississippi State	10
96	November 12, 2011	Starkville, MS	#4 Alabama	24	Mississippi State	7
97	October 27, 2012	Tuscaloosa, AL	#1 Alabama	38	#13 Mississippi State	7
98	November 16, 2013	Starkville, MS	#1 Alabama	20	Mississippi State	7
99	November 15, 2014	Tuscaloosa, AL	#5 Alabama	25	#1 Mississippi State	20
100	November 14, 2015	Starkville, MS	#2 Alabama	31	#17 Mississippi State	6
101	November 12, 2016	Tuscaloosa, AL	#1 Alabama	51	Mississippi State	3
102	November 11, 2017	Starkville, MS	#2 Alabama	31	#16 Mississippi State	24
103	November 10, 2018	Tuscaloosa, AL	#1 Alabama	24	#18 Mississippi State	0
104	November 16, 2019	Starkville, MS	#4 Alabama	38	Mississippi State	7
105	October 31, 2020	Tuscaloosa, AL	#2 Alabama	41	Mississippi State	0
106	October 16, 2021	Starkville, MS	#5 Alabama	49	Mississippi State	9
107	October 22, 2022	Tuscaloosa, AL	#6 Alabama	30	#24 Mississippi State	6
108	September 30, 2023	Starkville, MS	#12 Alabama	40	Mississippi State	17
109	October 3, 2026	Starkville, MS	#7 Alabama	56	#16 Mississippi State	23
Series: Alabama leads 87–18–3
† Alabama forfeited as part of NCAA penalties ‡ Alabama vacated wins as part of NCAA penalties

=== Locations ===
State	City	Games	Alabama victories	Mississippi State victories	Ties	Years played
Alabama	Tuscaloosa	56	47	9	0	1896–1902, 1905, 1925–present
Alabama	Birmingham	9	6	2	1	1913–22, 1978, 1987, 1989
Alabama	Montgomery	1	1	0	0	1932
Mississippi	Starkville	27	21	5	0	1906, 1928, 1948, 1951, 1958–62, 1986–present
Mississippi	Jackson	10	9	1	0	1964–65, 1969–1984
Mississippi	Columbus	3	1	1	1	1903–04, 1911
Mississippi	Meridian	2	2	0	0	1926, 1931
Mississippi	Aberdeen	1	0	1	0	1912

== See also ==
- List of NCAA college football rivalry games
- List of most-played college football series in NCAA Division I
