= 1974 Alabama Crimson Tide football team =

American college football season

1974 Alabama Crimson Tide football

SEC champion

Orange Bowl, L 11–13 vs. Notre Dame
- Conference: Southeastern Conference

Ranking
- Coaches: No. 2
- AP: No. 5
- Record: 11–1 (6–0 SEC)
- Head coach: Bear Bryant (17th season)
- Offensive coordinator: Bud Moore (1st season)
- Offensive scheme: Wishbone
- Defensive coordinator: Ken Donahue (1st season)
- Base defense: 5–2
- Captains: Sylvester Croom; Ricky Davis
- Home stadium: Denny Stadium; Legion Field

1974 Southeastern Conference football standings
	Conf.					Overall
Team	W		L		T	W		L		T
No. 5 Alabama $	6	–	0	–	0	11	–	1	–	0
No. 8 Auburn	4	–	2	–	0	10	–	2	–	0
Georgia	4	–	2	–	0	6	–	6	–	0
No. 17 Mississippi State	3	–	3	–	0	9	–	3	–	0
No. 15 Florida	3	–	3	–	0	8	–	4	–	0
Kentucky	3	–	3	–	0	6	–	5	–	0
No. 20 Tennessee	2	–	3	–	1	7	–	3	–	2
Vanderbilt	2	–	3	–	1	7	–	3	–	2
LSU	2	–	4	–	0	5	–	5	–	1
Ole Miss	0	–	6	–	0	3	–	8	–	0
$ – Conference champion; Rankings from AP Poll

The 1974 Alabama Crimson Tide football team (variously "Alabama", "UA" or "Bama") represented the University of Alabama in the 1974 NCAA Division I football season. It was the Crimson Tide's 80th overall and 41st season as a member of the Southeastern Conference (SEC). The team was led by head coach Bear Bryant, in his 17th year, and played their home games at Denny Stadium in Tuscaloosa and Legion Field in Birmingham, Alabama. They finished season with eleven wins and one loss (11–1 overall, 6–0 in the SEC), as SEC champions and with a loss to Notre Dame in the Orange Bowl.

As they entered the 1974 season, the Crimson Tide were one of the favorites to compete for the national championship. In their first game of the season, Alabama narrowly escaped with a win at Maryland in what was Bryant's first visit to College Park since he resigned as the Terrapins' head coach after their 1945 season. They followed with victories over Southern Miss, Vanderbilt and Ole Miss before they played in their closest game of the season against Florida State. Although the Crimson Tide entered their contest against the 0-4 Seminoles as a heavy favorite, they trailed for nearly the entire game until Bucky Berrey connected on the game-winning field goal from 36-yards out with only 0:33 left in the game. It was the closest Florida State would come to victory until scoring their only win at Miami in their ninth game to break a 20-game losing streak dating back to 1972.

In their next game, Alabama defeated rival Tennessee. After the Vols scored on a second quarter touchdown run, the Crimson Tide defense did not surrender another for 17 consecutive quarters against TCU, Mississippi State, LSU, and Miami. Alabama then closed the season with an Iron Bowl victory over Auburn, but then failed to capture the national championship after they lost to Notre Dame in the Orange Bowl. The loss extended their winless streak in bowl games to eight (0–7–1), which ended the following year.

== Schedule ==
Date	Opponent	Rank	Site	TV	Result	Attendance
September 14	at No. 14 Maryland*	No. 3	Byrd Stadium; College Park, MD		W 21–16	54,412
September 21	Southern Miss*	No. 5	Legion Field; Birmingham, AL		W 52–0	65,181
September 28	Vanderbilt	No. 4	Denny Stadium; Tuscaloosa, AL		W 23–10	58,419
October 5	at Ole Miss	No. 3	Mississippi Veterans Memorial Stadium; Jackson, MS (rivalry)	ABC	W 35–21	45,500
October 12	Florida State*	No. 3	Denny Stadium; Tuscaloosa, AL		W 8–7	58,394
October 19	at Tennessee	No. 4	Neyland Stadium; Knoxville, TN (Third Saturday in October)		W 28–6	74,286
October 26	TCU*	No. 4	Legion Field; Birmingham, AL		W 41–3	63,191
November 2	No. 17 Mississippi State^{†}	No. 4	Denny Stadium; Tuscaloosa, AL (rivalry)		W 35–0	59,069
November 9	LSU	No. 3	Legion Field; Birmingham, AL (rivalry)	ABC	W 30–0	70,364
November 16	at Miami (FL)*	No. 2	Miami Orange Bowl; Miami, FL		W 28–7	26,265
November 29	vs. No. 7 Auburn	No. 2	Legion Field; Birmingham, AL (Iron Bowl)	ABC	W 17–13	71,224
January 1, 1975	vs. No. 9 Notre Dame*	No. 2	Miami Orange Bowl; Miami, FL (Orange Bowl)	NBC	L 11–13	71,801
*Non-conference game; ^{†}Homecoming; Rankings from AP Poll released prior to the game

== Game summaries ==
=== Maryland ===
Team	1	2	3	4	Total
• #3 Alabama	7	7	7	0	21
#14 Maryland	0	6	3	7	16

- Date: September 14
- Location: Byrd Stadium
  College Park, Maryland
- Game attendance: 54,412

Scoring summary
1	Alabama	Calvin Culliver 7-yard run (Danny Ridgeway kick)	Alabama 7–0
2	Alabama	Calvin Culliver 73-yard run (Danny Ridgeway kick)	Alabama 14–0
2	Maryland	Steve Mike-Mayer 32-yard field goal	Alabama 14–3
2	Maryland	Steve Mike-Mayer 35-yard field goal	Alabama 14–6
3	Maryland	Steve Mike-Mayer 40-yard field goal	Alabama 14–9
3	Alabama	Richard Todd 1-yard run (Danny Ridgeway kick)	Alabama 21–9
4	Maryland	Louis Carter 1-yard run (Steve Mike-Mayer kick)	Alabama 21–16

As they entered their first game of the 1974 season, Alabama was ranked as the USA's No. 3 team and Maryland, coached by Bryant disciple Jerry Claiborne, as the No. 14 team in the AP Poll. Before what was then the largest crowd to ever attend a college football game in the state of Maryland, the Crimson Tide entered the game as a two-touchdown favorite, but struggled to a 21–16 win over the Terrapins. Alabama took a 14–0 lead in the second quarter behind a pair of Calvin Culliver touchdown runs. He scored one in each of the first two quarter with the first from seven and the second from 73-yards. The Terrapins responded with a pair of Steve Mike-Mayer field goals from 32 and 35-yards in the second and one from 40-yards in the third that cut the lead to 14–9.

After Richard Todd extended the Crimson Tide lead to 21–9 with his one-yard touchdown run in the third, Louis Carter made the final score 21–16 with his one-yard touchdown run for Maryland in the fourth. This game also marked the first for coach Bryant at College Park since he resigned as the Terrapins' head coach after their 1945 season. For his two touchdown, 169 yard performance, Culliver was recognized as the AP Southeastern Back of the Week.

=== Southern Miss ===
Team	1	2	3	4	Total
Southern Miss	0	0	0	0	0
• #5 Alabama	7	14	7	24	52

- Date: September 21
- Location: Legion Field
  Birmingham, Alabama
- Game attendance: 65,181

Scoring summary
1	Alabama	Richard Todd 11-yard run (Danny Ridgeway kick)	Alabama 7–0
2	Alabama	Russ Schamun 42-yard pass from Richard Todd (Danny Ridgeway kick)	Alabama 14–0
2	Alabama	Randy Billingsley 5-yard run (Danny Ridgeway kick)	Alabama 21–0
3	Alabama	Jack O'Rear 30-yard run (Danny Ridgeway kick)	Alabama 28–0
4	Alabama	Danny Ridgeway 27-yard field goal	Alabama 31–0
4	Alabama	Ralph Stokes 25-yard run (Danny Ridgeway kick)	Alabama 38–0
4	Alabama	Rick Watson 11-yard run (Danny Ridgeway kick)	Alabama 45–0
4	Alabama	John Boles 50-yard run (Danny Ridgeway kick)	Alabama 52–0

After their closer than expected victory over Maryland, Alabama dropped into the No. 5 position of the AP Poll prior to their game against Southern Miss. Against the Golden Eagles the Crimson Tide amassed 643 yards of total offense en route to this 52–0 victory at Legion Field. Alabama took a 7–0 first quarter lead on an 11-yard Richard Todd touchdown run. They then extended it to 21–0 at halftime behind a 42-yard Todd touchdown pass to Russ Schamun and a five-yard Randy Billingsley touchdown run.

A 30-yard Jack O'Rear touchdown run in the third made the score 28–0 as they entered the fourth quarter. In the final period, Danny Ridgeway connected on a 27-yard field goal and touchdowns were scored on runs of 25, 11 and 50-yards by Ralph Stokes, Rick Watson and John Boles respectively.

=== Vanderbilt ===
Team	1	2	3	4	Total
Vanderbilt	3	0	0	7	10
• #4 Alabama	7	3	10	3	23

- Date: September 28
- Location: Denny Stadium
  Tuscaloosa, Alabama
- Game attendance: 58,419

Scoring summary
1	Alabama	Calvin Culliver 85-yard run (Danny Ridgeway kick)	Alabama 7–0
1	Vanderbilt	Mark Adams 20-yard field goal	Alabama 7–3
2	Alabama	Bucky Berrey 36-yard field goal	Alabama 10–3
3	Alabama	Russ Schamun 14-yard pass from Richard Todd (Danny Ridgeway kick)	Alabama 17–3
3	Alabama	Bucky Berrey 42-yard field goal	Alabama 20–3
4	Alabama	Danny Ridgeway 27-yard field goal	Alabama 23–3
4	Vanderbilt	Walter Overton 26-yard pass from Fred Fisher (Mark Adams kick)	Alabama 23–10

After their victory over Southern Miss, Alabama moved into the No. 4 position in the AP Poll prior to their game against Vanderbilt. Against the Commodores, Vanderbilt, coached by Steve Sloan, the starting quarterback for the Tide's 1965 national championship team, kept it close, but ultimately fell to the Crimson Tide 23–10 in the first Tuscaloosa game of the season. After Calvin Culliver gave Alabama a 7–0 lead with his 85-yard touchdown run, Mark Adams connected on a 20-yard field goal for Vanderbilt that made the score 7–3 at the end of the first quarter. A 36-yard Bucky Berrey field goal in the second quarter gave the Crimson Tide a 10–3 halftime lead.

In the third, Richard Todd threw a 14-yard touchdown pass to Russ Schamun and Berrey connected on a 42-yard field goal that made the score 20–3 as the teams entered the final quarter. In the fourth, Danny Ridgeway connected on a 27-yard field goal for Alabama and Fred Fisher threw a 26-yard touchdown pass to Walter Overton for the Commodores that made the final score 23–10.

=== Ole Miss ===
Team	1	2	3	4	Total
• #3 Alabama	7	7	14	7	35
Ole Miss	0	7	14	0	21

- Date: October 5
- Location: Memorial Stadium
  Jackson, Mississippi
- Game attendance: 45,500

Scoring summary
1	Alabama	James Taylor 3-yard run (Danny Ridgeway kick)	Alabama 7–0
2	Ole Miss	Kenneth Lyons 9-yard run (Stephen Lavinghouze kick)	7–7
2	Alabama	Willie Shelby 3-yard run (Danny Ridgeway kick)	Alabama 14–7
3	Ole Miss	Kenneth Lyons 1-yard run (Stephen Lavinghouze kick)	14–14
3	Ole Miss	Gary Turner 42-yard interception return (Stephen Lavinghouze kick)	Ole Miss 21–14
3	Alabama	Willie Shelby 58-yard run (Danny Ridgeway kick)	21–21
3	Alabama	Rick Watson 8-yard run (Danny Ridgeway kick)	Alabama 28–21
4	Alabama	Richard Todd 1-yard run (Danny Ridgeway kick)	Alabama 35–21

After their victory over Vanderbilt, Alabama moved into the No. 3 position in the AP Poll prior to their game against Ole Miss. Playing before a televised audience, the Crimson Tide defeated the Rebels 35–21 at Jackson. Alabama took an early 7–0 lead on a three-yard James Taylor run in the first quarter. After the Rebels tied the game 7–7 on a nine-yard Kenneth Lyons touchdown run in the second, the Crimson Tide responded with a three-yard Willie Shelby touchdown run for a 14–7 halftime lead.

In the third, Ole Miss briefly took a 21–14 lead after touchdowns were scored on a one-yard Lyons run and a 42-yard Gary Turner interception return. Alabama responded with a pair of third quarter touchdowns of their own on runs of 58-yards by Shelby and eight-yards by Rick Watson. A one-yard Richard Todd touchdown run in the fourth quarter made the final score 35–21.

=== Florida State ===
Team	1	2	3	4	Total
Florida State	7	0	0	0	7
• #3 Alabama	0	0	3	5	8

- Date: October 12
- Location: Denny Stadium
  Tuscaloosa, Alabama
- Game attendance: 58,394

Scoring summary
1	Florida State	Larry Key 6-yard run (Ahmet Askin kick)	Florida State 7–0
3	Alabama	Bucky Berrey 44-yard field goal	Florida State 7–3
4	Alabama	Joe Downey ran out of the back of the end zone for safety	Florida State 7–5
4	Alabama	Bucky Berrey 36-yard field goal	Alabama 8–7

After their victory over Ole Miss, Alabama retained their No. 3 position in the AP Poll prior to their game against Florida State. Against the Seminoles, the Crimson Tide trailed until the final minute of regulation when Bucky Berrey converted the game-winning field goal for the 8–7 victory. The Seminoles took the opening kickoff and drove 78-yards on nine plays for a 7–0 lead behind a six-yard Larry Key touchdown run.

Florida State, which was 0-11 in 1973 and would finish 1974 1-10, continued to hold their touchdown lead through the third quarter when the Crimson Tide scored their first points on a 44-yard Berrey field goal. With just 1:27 left in the game, Seminoles head coach Darrell Mudra elected to take an intentional safety instead of attempting a punt out of the endzone. He made this decision as Alabama had been close on a couple of previous attempts to block punts during the game, and did not want a block to occur in the endzone. Down now 7–5, the Crimson Tide drove into field goal territory and Berrey hit the game winner from 36-yards out with only 0:33 left in the game.

=== Tennessee ===
Third Saturday in October

Team	1	2	3	4	Total
• #4 Alabama	0	7	14	7	28
Tennessee	0	6	0	0	6

- Date: October 19
- Location: Neyland Stadium
  Knoxville, Tennessee
- Game attendance: 74,286

Scoring summary
2	Alabama	Willie Shelby 13-yard run (Danny Ridgeway kick)	Alabama 7–0
2	Tennessee	Stanley Morgan 64-yard run (Ricky Townsend kick failed)	Alabama 7–6
3	Alabama	Willie Shelby 19-yard run (Danny Ridgeway kick)	Alabama 14–6
3	Alabama	Calvin Culliver 30-yard run (Danny Ridgeway kick)	Alabama 21–6
4	Alabama	Calvin Culliver 6-yard run (Bill Davis kick)	Alabama 28–6

After their closer than expected victory over Florida State, Alabama dropped into the No. 4 position prior to their game at Tennessee. Both Willie Shelby and Calvin Culliver each scored a pair of touchdowns for the Crimson Tide in this 28–6 victory over the Volunteers. After a scoreless first, Alabama took a 7–0 on a 13-yard touchdown run by Willie Shelby in the second quarter. Tennessee responded with their only points on a 64-yard Stanley Morgan touchdown run and made the halftime score 7–6.

The Crimson Tide extended their lead to 21–6 at the end of the third behind touchdown runs of 19-yards by Shelby and 30-yards by Calvin Culliver. Culliver then scored the final points of the game with his six-yard touchdown run that made the final score 28–6.

=== TCU ===
Team	1	2	3	4	Total
TCU	0	3	0	0	3
• #4 Alabama	14	7	7	13	41

- Date: October 26
- Location: Legion Field
  Birmingham, Alabama
- Game attendance: 63,191

Scoring summary
1	Alabama	Robert Fraley 4-yard run (Danny Ridgeway kick)	Alabama 7–0
1	Alabama	Rick Watson 1-yard run (Danny Ridgeway kick)	Alabama 14–0
2	TCU	Tony Biasatti 30-yard field goal	Alabama 14–3
2	Alabama	George Pugh 5-yard pass from Robert Fraley (Danny Ridgeway kick)	Alabama 21–3
3	Alabama	Ozzie Newsome 15-yard pass from Robert Fraley (Danny Ridgeway kick)	Alabama 28–3
4	Alabama	Jerry Brown 15-yard pass from Jack O'Rear (Run failed)	Alabama 34–3
4	Alabama	Jack O'Rear 21-yard run (Danny Ridgeway kick)	Alabama 41–3

After their victory over Tennessee, Alabama retained their No. 4 position prior to their out of conference match-up against Texas Christian University (TCU) at Legion Field. Against the Horned Frogs of the Southwest Conference, Alabama won 41–3 for their first all-time victory over TCU. The Crimson Tide took a 14–0 lead in the first quarter behind touchdown runs of four and one-yard by Robert Fraley and Rick Watson before TCU scored their only points on a 30-yard Tony Biasatti field goal in the second. Alabama responded with a five-yard Robert Fraley touchdown pass to George Pugh just prior to the break that made the score 21–3 at halftime.

The Crimson Tide continued their scoring with three second half touchdowns en route to their 41–3 victory. Ozzie Newsome scored on a 15-yard Fraley pass in the third and Jack O'Rear threw a 15-yard touchdown pass to Jerry Brown and scored on a 21-yard run in the fourth.

=== Mississippi State ===
Team	1	2	3	4	Total
#17 Mississippi State	0	0	0	0	0
• #4 Alabama	6	13	0	16	35

- Date: November 2
- Location: Denny Stadium
  Tuscaloosa, Alabama
- Game attendance: 59,069

Scoring summary
1	Alabama	Robert Fraley 1-yard run (Danny Ridgeway kick failed)	Alabama 6–0
2	Alabama	Calvin Culliver 1-yard run (2-point run failed)	Alabama 12–0
2	Alabama	Richard Todd 2-yard run (Danny Ridgeway kick)	Alabama 19–0
4	Alabama	Randy Billingsley 7-yard run (Danny Ridgeway kick failed)	Alabama 25–0
4	Alabama	Bucky Berrey 42-yard field goal	Alabama 28–0
4	Alabama	Ray Sewell 5-yard run (Ron DiChiara kick)	Alabama 35–0

As they entered their game against Mississippi State, Alabama retained their No. 4 position in the AP Poll and the Bulldogs were in the No. 17 position. On homecoming and before what was then the largest crowd in the history of Denny Stadium, the Crimson Tide shutout Mississippi State 35–0 for the second consecutive season. Alabama took a 6–0 first quarter lead behind a one-yard Robert Fraley touchdown run. They then extended it to 19–0 at halftime behind touchdown runs of one-yard by Calvin Culliver and two-yards by Richard Todd.

After a scoreless third, the Crimson Tide closed the game with 16 fourth quarter points for the 35–0 win. Touchdowns were scored in the final period on runs of seven-yards by Randy Billingsley and five-yards by Ray Sewell with a 42-yard Bucky Berrey field goal providing for the final margin.

=== LSU ===
Team	1	2	3	4	Total
LSU	0	0	0	0	0
• #3 Alabama	7	16	0	7	30

- Date: November 9
- Location: Legion Field
  Birmingham, Alabama
- Game attendance: 70,364
- Television network: ABC

Scoring summary
1	Alabama	Calvin Culliver 1-yard run (Danny Ridgeway kick)	Alabama 7–0
2	Alabama	Danny Ridgeway 20-yard field goal	Alabama 10–0
2	Alabama	Ricky Davis 29-yard fumble return (2-point pass failed)	Alabama 16–0
2	Alabama	Richard Todd 3-yard run (Danny Ridgeway kick)	Alabama 23–0
4	Alabama	Jack O'Rear 2-yard run (Danny Ridgeway kick)	Alabama 30–0

After their victory over Mississippi State, Alabama moved into the No. 3 position in the AP Poll prior to their nationally televised game against LSU. With their 30–0 victory over the rival Tigers, the Crimson Tide secured both a share of the 1974 conference championship and a place in the Orange Bowl.

Alabama took a 7–0 first quarter lead behind a one-yard Calvin Culliver touchdown run. They extended it further to 23–0 at halftime after points were scored on a 20-yard Danny Ridgeway field goal, a 29-yard Ricky Davis fumble return and on a three-yard Richard Todd touchdown run. After a scoreless third, the Crimson Tide closed with a two-yard Jack O'Rear touchdown run in the fourth for the 30–0 win. For their performances, Willie Shelby was recognized as the SEC Back of the Week and Leroy Cook was recognized as the SEC Lineman of the Week.

=== Miami (FL) ===
Team	1	2	3	4	Total
• #2 Alabama	14	7	0	7	28
Miami	0	0	0	7	7

- Date: November 16
- Location: Orange Bowl
  Miami, Florida
- Game attendance: 26,265

Scoring summary
1	Alabama	George Pugh 8-yard pass from Richard Todd (Danny Ridgeway kick)	Alabama 7–0
1	Alabama	Jerry Brown 8-yard pass from Richard Todd (Danny Ridgeway kick)	Alabama 14–0
2	Alabama	Gary Rutledge 12-yard run (Danny Ridgeway kick)	Alabama 21–0
4	Miami	Johnny Williams 1-yard run (Chris Dennis kick)	Alabama 21–7
4	Alabama	Willie Shelby 62-yard punt return (Danny Ridgeway kick)	Alabama 28–7

As they entered their game against Miami, Alabama moved into the No. 2 position in the AP Poll. Before a relatively small crowd (one-third the size of the sellout crowd which jammed the Orange Bowl the next day to watch the Miami Dolphins defeat the Buffalo Bills), Alabama defeated the Hurricanes 28–7 and secured Bryant's 150th victory as head coach of the Crimson Tide. The Crimson Tide opened the game with a pair of eight-yard Richard Todd touchdown passes to George Pugh and Jerry Brown for a 14–0 lead. They then extended their lead to 21–0 at halftime behind a 12-yard Gary Rutledge touchdown run in the second quarter.

After a scoreless third, Miami scored their only points on a one-yard Johnny Williams touchdown run in the fourth that marked the first touchdown scored against the Crimson Tide defense in 17 quarters. Alabama responded with a 62-yard Willie Shelby punt return late in the fourth that made the final score 28–7.

=== Auburn ===
Iron Bowl

Team	1	2	3	4	Total
• #2 Alabama	7	3	7	0	17
#7 Auburn	0	7	0	6	13

- Date: November 29
- Location: Legion Field
  Birmingham, Alabama
- Game attendance: 71,224
- Television network: ABC

Scoring summary
1	Alabama	Willie Shelby 45-yard pass from Richard Todd (Danny Ridgeway kick)	Alabama 7–0
2	Alabama	Bucky Berrey 36-yard field goal	Alabama 10–0
2	Auburn	Secdrick McIntyre 1-yard run (Chris Wilson kick)	Alabama 10–7
3	Alabama	Calvin Culliver 13-yard run (Danny Ridgeway kick)	Alabama 17–7
4	Auburn	Phil Gargis 2-yard run (2-point pass failed)	Alabama 17–13

As they entered the annual Iron Bowl, Alabama retained the No. 2 position and Auburn the No. 7 in the AP Poll prior to their match-up at Legion Field. Against the Tigers, the Crimson Tide were victorious as they edged out a 17–13 win at Birmingham. Alabama scored on a 45-yard Richard Todd touchdown pass to Willie Shelby in the first and on a 36-yard Bucky Berrey field goal in the second for a 10–0 lead. Auburn responded with a one-yard Secdrick McIntyre touchdown run late in the second that made the halftime score 10–7.

The Crimson Tide extended their lead to 17–7 early in the third with their only second half points on a 13-yard Calvin Culliver touchdown run. The Tigers then brought the final margin to 17–13 with a two-yard Phil Gargis touchdown run in the fourth.

=== Notre Dame ===
Orange Bowl

Team	1	2	3	4	Total
• #9 Notre Dame	7	6	0	0	13
#2 Alabama	0	3	0	8	11

- Date: January 1, 1975
- Location: Orange Bowl
  Miami, Florida
- Game attendance: 71,801
- Television network: NBC

Scoring summary
1	Notre Dame	Wayne Bullock 4-yard run (Dave Reeve kick)	Notre Dame 7–0
2	Notre Dame	Mark McLane 9-yard run (Dave Reeve kick failed)	Notre Dame 13–0
2	Alabama	Danny Ridgeway 21-yard field goal	Notre Dame 13–3
4	Alabama	Russ Schamun 48-yard pass from Richard Todd (2-point pass good)	Notre Dame 13–11

Playing for what would have been a second consecutive UPI national championship against Notre Dame, Alabama was upset by the Fighting Irish 13–11 in the Orange Bowl. Notre Dame took a 13–0 lead behind touchdown runs of four-yards by Wayne Bullock in the first and nine-yards by Mark McLane in the second quarter. A 21-yard Danny Ridgeway field goal for Alabama made the halftime score 13–3. After a scoreless third, the Crimson Tide scored the final points of the game on a 48-yard Richard Todd touchdown pass to Russ Schamun that made the final score 13–11.

== Roster ==
1974 Alabama Crimson Tide football team roster
Players
Coaches
Offense

Pos.	#	Name	Class
G		Bo Batey	So
RB	26	Randy Billingsley	Sr
RB	38	Duffy Boles	Jr
RB		Joey Bolton	So
OT		Jim Bradford	So
TE		Jerry Brown	Jr
OT		Woody Buchanan	So
C	59	Sylvester Croom	Sr
FB	33	Calvin Culliver	So
OT		Bobby Davis	So
RB		Bobby Duke	So
RB		Donnie Faust	So
QB		Les Fowler	So
QB	12	Robert Fraley	Jr
G		David Gerasimchuk	So
HB		Dennis Gramann	So
HB		John Gunnels	So
G		Gary Hanrahan	Jr
RB	84	Joe Dale Harris	Jr
FB		Bob Haught	So
FB		Ronnie Kuykendall	So
HB		John LaBue	So
C	58	Rand Lambert	Sr
C		K. J. Lazenby	So
OT		Ralph McElreath	So
OT		Barry McGee	Jr
C		David McIntyre	So
TE		Rick McLain	So
G		Ray Maxwell	Jr
TE	28	Tom Nelson	Jr
QB		Jack O'Rear	So
OT		Gary Oser	So
G	71	Steve Patterson	Sr
HB		Lefty Perry	Jr
OT		Buddy Pope	Jr
TE	88	George Pugh	Jr
G		Mark Reese	So
QB	15	Danny Ridgeway	Jr
G	61	John Rogers	Sr
G		Larry Ruffin	Jr
QB	11	Gary Rutledge	Sr
SE	25	Russ Schamun	So
RB	30	Willie Shelby	Jr
HB		Jimbo Smith	Jr
C		Sid Smith	So
RB		Mike Stock	Jr
RB	42	Ralph Stokes	Sr
WR		Sam Tate	Jr
RB	27	James Taylor	Jr
OT		Chip Tillman	So
QB	14	Richard Todd	Jr
HB		Jim Ward	So
OT		Jerry Washco	Jr
FB		Rick Watson	So
G	72	Richard Whitley	Sr
WR		Darrell Owen	Sr

Defense

Pos.	#	Name	Class
SS		Tom Baggett	So
DT		Ronnie Joe Barnes	Jr
DT	91	Bob Baumhower	So
S	17	Ray Bolden	Jr
LB		Tom Bouck	So
LB		Neil Callaway	So
DB		Pete Cavan	So
DE		Mike Christian	So
DE		Danny Collins	So
DE	98	Leroy Cook	Jr
S		John Crowe	So
DB	19	Ricky Davis	Sr
LB	54	Mike DuBose	Sr
LB		Conley Duncan	Jr
DB		Thad Flanagan	So
DB		Steve Ford	Jr
DT	62	Randy Hall	Sr
DT		Charles Hannah	So
DE		Paul Harris	So
DT		Bill Harrison	So
DT		Bill Henderson	So
DE		Bruce Hodges	So
LB		Colenzo Hubbard	So
DT		Tim Hurst	So
DB		Chuck Justice	So
J		Tyrone King	So
DT	66	Steve Kulback	Jr
LB		Mark Lipari	So
LB		Woodrow Lowe	Jr
DE		James McArthur	So
DE		Sam Maddox	So
J		Greg Montgomery	So
LB		Danny Neal	So
DE		John Niehaus	So
S		Alan Pizzitola	Jr
SS		Mark Prudhomme	Jr
DB		Wayne Rhodes	Jr
DB	23	Mike Riley	Sr
LB	55	Ronnie Robertson	Sr
LB		John Sheehan	So
LB		Jack Smalley	So
DE		Dick Turpin	Jr
DB	34	Mike Washington	Sr
DT		Gus White	So

Special teams

Pos.	#	Name	Class
PK		Bucky Berrey	So
PK		Mike Davis	So
PK		Ron Dichiara	Jr
WR	82	Darrell Owen	Sr
PK		Rod Nelson	So

Head coach

- Bear Bryant (17th year, Alabama)

Coordinators/assistant coaches

- Paul Crane (1st year, Alabama)
- Ken Donahue (11th year, Tennessee)
- Jim Goostree (18th year, Tennessee)
- Clem Gryska (15th year, Alabama)
- Curley Hallman (2nd year, Texas A&M)
- Dude Hennessey (15th year, Kentucky)
- Al Kincaid (1st year, Virginia Tech)
- Bobby Marks (3rd year, Texas A&M)
- Ken Martin (4th year, Alabama)
- John Mitchell (2nd year, Alabama)
- Bud Moore (3rd year, Alabama)
- Mal Moore (11th year, Alabama)
- Bill Oliver (4th year, Alabama)
- Dee Powell (11th year, Texas A&M)
- Jack Rutledge (9th year, Alabama)

Legend

- (C) Team captain
- (S) Suspended
- (I) Ineligible
- Injured
- Redshirt

Roster
Last update: February 24, 2024

== NFL draft ==
Several players that were varsity lettermen from the 1974 squad were selected in the NFL draft in the 1975, 1976 and 1977. These players included:

Year	Round	Overall	Player name	Position	NFL team
1975 NFL draft	3	53	Mike Washington	Defensive back	Baltimore Colts
1975 NFL draft	8	195	Ricky Davis	Defensive back	Cincinnati Bengals
1976 NFL draft	1	6	Richard Todd	Quarterback	New York Jets
1976 NFL draft	4	108	Wayne Rhodes	Defensive back	Chicago Bears
1976 NFL draft	5	131	Woodrow Lowe	Linebacker	San Diego Chargers
1976 NFL draft	5	138	Willie Shelby	Running back	Cincinnati Bengals
1976 NFL draft	10	290	Leroy Cook	Defensive end	Dallas Cowboys
1976 NFL draft	12	341	Joe Dale Harris	Wide receiver	Cincinnati Bengals
1977 NFL draft	2	40	Bob Baumhower	Nose tackle	Miami Dolphins
1977 NFL draft	3	57	Charley Hannah	Offensive guard	Tampa Bay Buccaneers
1977 NFL draft	6	159	Paul Harris	Linebacker	Pittsburgh Steelers
1977 NFL draft	8	212	Calvin Culliver	Running back	Denver Broncos
