= 1974 Florida Gators football team =

American college football season

1974 Florida Gators football

Sugar Bowl, L 10–13 vs. Nebraska
- Conference: Southeastern Conference

Ranking
- Coaches: No. 12
- AP: No. 15
- Record: 8–4 (3–3 SEC)
- Head coach: Doug Dickey (5th season)
- Offensive coordinator: Jimmy Dunn (5th season)
- Offensive scheme: Wishbone
- Defensive coordinator: Doug Knotts (5th season)
- Captains: Lee McGriff; Ralph Ortega
- Home stadium: Florida Field

1974 Southeastern Conference football standings
	Conf.					Overall
Team	W		L		T	W		L		T
No. 5 Alabama $	6	–	0	–	0	11	–	1	–	0
No. 8 Auburn	4	–	2	–	0	10	–	2	–	0
Georgia	4	–	2	–	0	6	–	6	–	0
No. 17 Mississippi State	3	–	3	–	0	9	–	3	–	0
No. 15 Florida	3	–	3	–	0	8	–	4	–	0
Kentucky	3	–	3	–	0	6	–	5	–	0
No. 20 Tennessee	2	–	3	–	1	7	–	3	–	2
Vanderbilt	2	–	3	–	1	7	–	3	–	2
LSU	2	–	4	–	0	5	–	5	–	1
Ole Miss	0	–	6	–	0	3	–	8	–	0
$ – Conference champion; Rankings from AP Poll

The 1974 Florida Gators football team represented the University of Florida during the 1974 NCAA Division I football season. The season was Doug Dickey's fifth as the head coach of the Florida Gators football team. Dickey's 1974 Florida Gators finished with an 8–4 overall record and a 3–3 record in the Southeastern Conference (SEC), tying for fourth among ten SEC teams.

Powered by a strong backfield that included Tony Green and Jimmy DuBose, Dickey employed the wishbone offense for the first season in the Gators' history.

== Schedule ==
Date	Opponent	Rank	Site	TV	Result	Attendance	Source
September 14	California*		Florida Field; Gainesville, FL		W 21–17	39,521	
September 21	vs. No. 14 Maryland*		Tampa Stadium; Tampa, FL		W 17–10	41,140	
September 28	Mississippi State		Florida Field; Gainesville, FL		W 29–13	48,843	
October 5	LSU	No. 13	Florida Field; Gainesville, FL (rivalry)		W 24–14	56,590	
October 12	at Vanderbilt	No. 8	Dudley Field; Nashville, TN		L 10–24	25,800	
October 19	at Florida State*	No. 14	Doak Campbell Stadium; Tallahassee, FL (rivalry)		W 24–14	42,541	
October 26	Duke*^{†}	No. 12	Florida Field; Gainesville, FL		W 30–13	56,251	
November 2	No. 5 Auburn	No. 11	Florida Field; Gainesville, FL (rivalry)	ABC	W 25–14	64,912	
November 9	vs. Georgia	No. 6	Gator Bowl Stadium; Jacksonville, FL (rivalry)		L 16–17	70,716	
November 16	at Kentucky	No. 9	Commonwealth Stadium; Lexington, KY (rivalry)	ABC	L 24–41	45,000	
November 30	Miami (FL)*		Florida Field; Gainesville, FL (rivalry)		W 31–7	48,563	
December 31	vs. No. 8 Nebraska*	No. 18	Tulane Stadium; New Orleans, LA (Sugar Bowl)	ABC	L 10–13	67,890	
*Non-conference game; ^{†}Homecoming; Rankings from AP Poll released prior to the game

== Roster ==
1974 Florida Gators football team roster
Players			Coaches
Offense: Pos. / # / Name / Class; QB / / Don Gaffney	Defense: Pos. / # / Name / Class	Special teams: Pos. / # / Name / Class; K / / David Posey	Head coach: Doug Dickey; Coordinators/assistant coaches Legend: (C) Team captain; (S) Suspended; (I) Ineligible; Injured; Redshirt
