= 1974 Peach Bowl =

American college football game

- 7th Peach Bowl
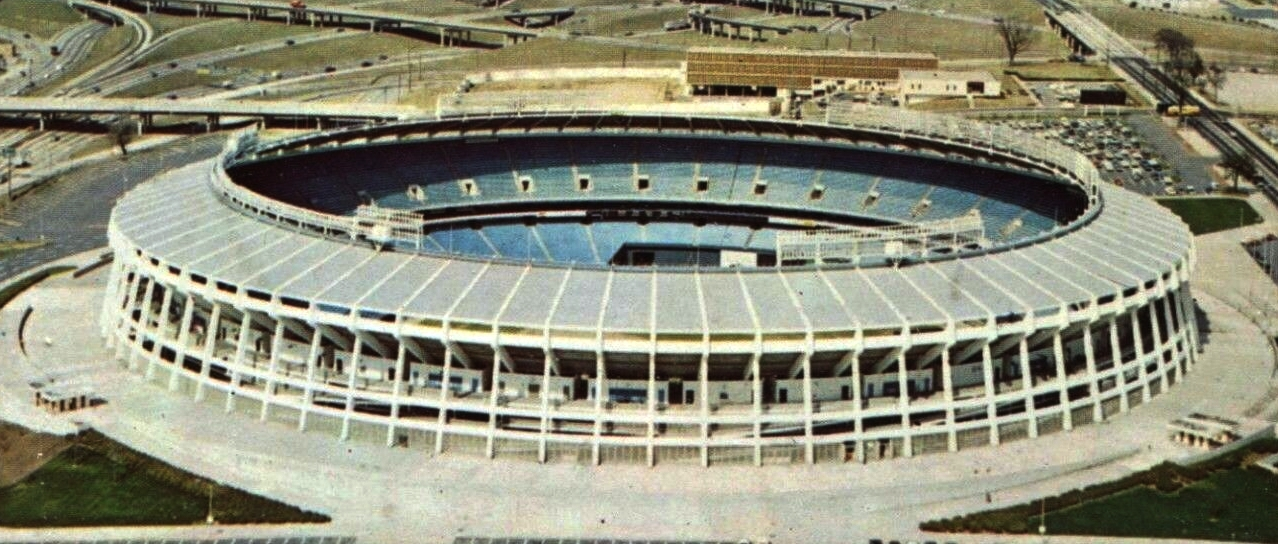
- Atlanta–Fulton County Stadium in Atlanta, Georgia, hosted the Peach Bowl.
Texas Tech Red Raiders	Vanderbilt Commodores
(6-4–1)	(7-3–1)
SWC	SEC
6	6
Head coach: Jim Carlen	Head coach: Steve Sloan
	1	2	3	4	Total
Texas Tech	0	0	3	3	6
Vanderbilt	0	3	0	3	6
- Date: December 28, 1974
- Season: 1974
- Stadium: Fulton County Stadium
- Location: Atlanta, Georgia
- MVP: Offensive: Larry Isaac, Texas Tech; Defensive: Dennis Harrison, Vanderbilt
- Referee: Percy Penn (SWC; split crew: SWC, SEC)
- Attendance: 34,188

The 1974 Peach Bowl was a college football bowl game between the Texas Tech Red Raiders and the Vanderbilt Commodores at Atlanta–Fulton County Stadium in Atlanta, Georgia. Texas Tech represented the Southwest Conference (SWC) and Vanderbilt represented the Southeastern Conference (SEC) in the competition. The game was the final competition of the 1974 football season for each team and resulted in a 6–6 tie.

As of the end of the 2024 college football season, the two teams have only played each other once, yet neither has a win in the matchup, resulting in a .500 head-to-head winning percentage.

== Background ==
Texas Tech entered the game with a 6–4–1 record and had been ranked most of the season, rising as high as #9 in the AP Poll during the season. Losses in Texas Tech's final two regular season games bumped them out of the poll. Vanderbilt entered the game with a 7–3–1 record, closing their regular season with a tie against rival Tennessee. This was their first bowl game since 1955.

== Game summary ==
Neither team scored in the first quarter. Vanderbilt led 3–0 at halftime thanks to a 31-yard field goal kicked with ten minutes left in the second quarter.

With three minutes left in the third quarter the Red Raiders drove to the Vanderbilt 16 yard line but only got 3 points out of the drive on a 26-yard field goal. Texas Tech then attempted another field goal after a Vanderbilt fumble but the attempt was blocked.

In the fourth quarter Vanderbilt retook the lead, 6–3, after a 26-yard field goal. Texas Tech responded with a 35-yard field goal with two minutes left in the game. Vanderbilt could not turn its final possession into a score and the game ended in a 6–6 tie.

Texas Tech finished with 19 first downs to Vanderbilt's 10 and with 306 yards of rushing offense to Vanderbilt's 140.

== Statistics ==
Statistics	Texas Tech	Vanderbilt
First downs	19	10
Rushing yards	306	140
Passing yards	35	60
Total offense	341	200
Punt average	35.8	40.1

== Sources ==
- Phil Steele's SEC Football 2009 Preview, p. 49
