= 1974 Mississippi State Bulldogs football team =

American college football season

1974 Mississippi State Bulldogs football

Sun Bowl, W 26–24 vs. North Carolina
- Conference: Southeastern Conference

Ranking
- Coaches: No. 17
- AP: No. 17
- Record: 9–3 (3–3 SEC)
- Head coach: Bob Tyler (2nd season)
- Home stadium: Scott Field; Mississippi Veterans Memorial Stadium

1974 Southeastern Conference football standings
	Conf.					Overall
Team	W		L		T	W		L		T
No. 5 Alabama $	6	–	0	–	0	11	–	1	–	0
No. 8 Auburn	4	–	2	–	0	10	–	2	–	0
Georgia	4	–	2	–	0	6	–	6	–	0
No. 17 Mississippi State	3	–	3	–	0	9	–	3	–	0
No. 15 Florida	3	–	3	–	0	8	–	4	–	0
Kentucky	3	–	3	–	0	6	–	5	–	0
No. 20 Tennessee	2	–	3	–	1	7	–	3	–	2
Vanderbilt	2	–	3	–	1	7	–	3	–	2
LSU	2	–	4	–	0	5	–	5	–	1
Ole Miss	0	–	6	–	0	3	–	8	–	0
$ – Conference champion; Rankings from AP Poll

The 1974 Mississippi State Bulldogs football team represented Mississippi State University during the 1974 NCAA Division I football season. Led by second-year coach Bob Tyler, the Bulldogs finished 9–3 and qualified for their first bowl game in 11 years. In addition, the Bulldogs finished ranked No. 17 in the final AP Poll, their first ranked finish in 17 seasons. Quarterback Rockey Felker was awarded SEC "Player of the Year" by the Nashville Banner. Defensive tackle Jimmy Webb was voted to multiple All-American teams.

== Schedule ==
Date	Opponent	Rank	Site	TV	Result	Attendance	Source
September 7	William & Mary*		Mississippi Veterans Memorial Stadium; Jackson, MS		W 49–7	8,108	
September 21	Georgia		Mississippi Veterans Memorial Stadium; Jackson, MS		W 38–14	38,077	
September 28	at Florida		Florida Field; Gainesville, FL		L 13–29	48,843	
October 5	Kansas State*		Scott Field; Starkville, MS		W 21–16	31,000	
October 12	at Lamar*		Cardinal Stadium; Beaumont, TX		W 37–21	16,817	
October 19	at Memphis State*		Memphis Memorial Stadium; Memphis TN		W 29–28	38,557	
October 26	Louisville*		Scott Field; Starkville, MS		W 56–7	35,000	
November 2	at No. 4 Alabama	No. 17	Denny Stadium; Tuscaloosa, AL (rivalry)		L 0–35	59,069	
November 9	No. 10 Auburn		Mississippi Veterans Memorial Stadium; Jackson, MS		L 20–24	38,000	
November 16	LSU		Mississippi Veterans Memorial Stadium; Jackson, MS (rivalry)		W 7–6	37,000	
November 23	vs. Ole Miss		Mississippi Veterans Memorial Stadium; Jackson, MS (Egg Bowl)		W 31–13	46,500	
December 28	vs. North Carolina*		Sun Bowl; El Paso, TX (Sun Bowl)	CBS	W 26–24	26,035	
*Non-conference game; Rankings from AP Poll released prior to the game

== Season summary ==
=== vs Ole Miss ===
External videos
- Bulldog Rewind – 1974 vs. Ole Miss
