= 1974 NCAA Division I football rankings =

- Season: 1974
- Bowl season: 1974–75 bowl games
- Preseason No. 1: Oklahoma
- End of season champions: Oklahoma (AP); USC (Coaches)

Two human polls comprised the 1974 National Collegiate Athletic Association (NCAA) Division I football rankings. Unlike most sports, college football's governing body, the NCAA, does not bestow a national championship, instead that title is bestowed by one or more different polling agencies. There are two main weekly polls that begin in the preseason—the AP Poll and the Coaches Poll.

== Legend ==
	Increase in ranking
	Decrease in ranking
	Not ranked previous week
	National champion
(#–#)	Win–loss record
(Italics)	Number of first place votes
т	Tied with team above or below also with this symbol

== AP Poll ==
	Preseason Aug	Week 1 Sep 9	Week 2 Sep 16	Week 3 Sep 23	Week 4 Sep 30	Week 5 Oct 7	Week 6 Oct 14	Week 7 Oct 21	Week 8 Oct 28	Week 9 Nov 4	Week 10 Nov 11	Week 11 Nov 18	Week 12 Nov 25	Week 13 Dec 2	Week 14 (Final) Jan	
1.	Oklahoma (23)	Oklahoma (0–0) (22)	Notre Dame (1–0) (19)	Ohio State (2–0) (23)	Ohio State (3–0) (25 1/5)	Ohio State (4–0) (33)	Ohio State (5–0) (51)	Ohio State (6–0) (50)	Ohio State (7–0) (45)	Ohio State (8–0) (49)	Oklahoma (8–0) (48)	Oklahoma (9–0) (45)	Oklahoma (10–0) (49)	Oklahoma (11–0) (49)	Oklahoma (11–0) (51)	1.
2.	Ohio State (14)	Notre Dame (1–0) (17)	Ohio State (1–0) (17)	Notre Dame (2–0) (26)	Oklahoma (2–0) (24 1/5)	Oklahoma (3–0) (24)	Oklahoma (4–0) (5)	Oklahoma (5–0) (8)	Oklahoma (6–0) (14)	Oklahoma (7–0) (10)	Alabama (9–0) (10)	Alabama (10–0) (9)	Alabama (10–0) (10)	Alabama (11–0) (12)	USC (10–1–1) (6)	2.
3.	Notre Dame (13)	Alabama (0–0) (5)	Oklahoma (1–0) (18)	Oklahoma (1–0) (8)	Alabama (3–0) (3 1/5)	Alabama (4–0) (1)	Michigan (5–0) (1)	Michigan (6–0) (1)	Michigan (7–0) (2)	Alabama (8–0) (2)	Michigan (9–0) (4)	Michigan (10–0) (8)	Ohio State (10–1)	Ohio State (10–1)	Michigan (10–1) (2)	3.
4.	Alabama (6)	Ohio State (0–0) (9)	Nebraska (1–0) (10)	Alabama (2–0) (4)	Michigan (3–0) (4 1/5)	Michigan (4–0) (2)	Alabama (5–0) (1)	Alabama (6–0) (1)	Alabama (7–0) (1)	Michigan (8–0) (1)	Ohio State (8–1)	Ohio State (9–1)	Michigan (10–1)	Michigan (10–1)	Ohio State (10–2)	4.
5.	USC (1)	USC (0–0) (1)	Alabama (1–0) (4)	Michigan (2–0)	Texas A&M (3–0) (1 1/5)	Nebraska (3–1)	Auburn (5–0) (1)	Auburn (6–0) (1)	Auburn (7–0) (1)	Texas A&M (7–1)	Notre Dame (7–1)	Notre Dame (8–1)	Notre Dame (9–1)	USC (9–1–1)	Alabama (11–1)	5.
6.	Michigan (1)	Michigan (0–0)	Michigan (1–0)	Texas (2–0)	Nebraska (2–1)	Notre Dame (3–1)	USC (3–1)	USC (4–1)	USC (5–1)	Florida (7–1)	Nebraska (7–2)	Nebraska (8–2)	USC (8–1–1)	Auburn (9–2)	Notre Dame (10–2)	6.
7.	Nebraska	Nebraska (0–0)	LSU (1–0)	Arizona State (2–0)	Notre Dame (2–1)	USC (2–1)	Notre Dame (4–1)	Notre Dame (5–1)	Notre Dame (6–1)	Penn State (7–1)	Auburn (8–1)	Auburn (9–1)	Auburn (9–1)	Penn State (9–2)	Penn State (10–2)	7.
8.	Penn State	Penn State (0–0)	Penn State (1–0)	Pittsburgh (2–0)	NC State (3–0)	Florida (4–0)	Texas A&M (4–1)	Texas A&M (5–1)	Texas A&M (6–1)	Notre Dame (7–1)	USC (6–1–1)	USC (7–1–1)	Texas A&M (8–2)	Nebraska (8–3)	Auburn (10–2) (1)	8.
9.	LSU	LSU (0–0)	Texas (1–0)	Texas A&M (2–0)	USC (1–1)	Texas Tech (3–0–1)	Arizona (5–0)	Nebraska (4–2)	Nebraska (5–2)	Nebraska (6–2)	Florida (7–2)	Texas A&M (8–2)	Nebraska (8–3)	Notre Dame (9–2)	Nebraska (9–3)	9.
10.	Texas	Texas (0–0)	Arkansas (1–0)	Nebraska (1–1)	Texas Tech (2–0–1)	Auburn (4–0) (1)	NC State (5–0)	Penn State (5–1)	Penn State (6–1)	Auburn (7–1)	Texas A&M (7–2)	Penn State (8–2)	Penn State (8–2)	Maryland (8–3)	Miami (OH) (10–0–1)	10.
11.	Houston	Arizona State (1–0)	Arizona State (1–0)	Wisconsin (2–0)	Auburn (3–0)	NC State (4–0)	Penn State (4–1)	Texas Tech (4–1–1)	Florida (6–1)	USC (5–1–1)	Penn State (7–2)	Maryland (7–3)	Maryland (8–3)	Texas (8–3)	NC State (9–2–1)	11.
12.	UCLA	UCLA (0–0–1)	UCLA (0–0–1)	Oklahoma State (2–0)	Arizona (3–0)	Arizona (4–0)	Nebraska (3–2)	Florida (5–1)	Texas (5–2)	Texas (6–2)	Miami (OH) (8–0–1)	Miami (OH) (9–0–1)	Miami (OH) (9–0–1)	Baylor (8–3)	Michigan State (7–3–1)	12.
13.	Pittsburgh	Pittsburgh (0–0)	USC (0–1)	NC State (2–0)	Florida (3–0)	Wisconsin (3–1)	Kansas (4–1)	Texas (4–2)	Texas Tech (5–1–1)	Miami (OH) (7–0–1)	Maryland (6–3)	NC State (8–2)	NC State (9–2)	NC State (9–2)	Maryland (8–4)	13.
14.	Maryland	Maryland (0–0)	Maryland (0–1)	Tennessee (1–0–1)	Illinois (3–0)	Arkansas (3–1)	Florida (4–1)	Arizona State (4–1)	Arizona State (5–1)	Maryland (5–3)	Houston (6–2)	Michigan State (6–3–1)	Michigan State (7–3–1)	Michigan State (7–3–1)	Baylor (8–4)	14.
15.	Arizona State	Tennessee (0–0)	NC State (1–0) т	Arizona (2–0)	Penn State (2–1)	Penn State (3–1)	Arizona State (3–1)	Maryland (4–2)	Maryland (5–2)	Houston (6–2)	Michigan State (5–3–1)	Houston (7–2)	Houston (8–2)	Miami (OH) (9–0–1)	Florida (8–4)	15.
16.	Tennessee	NC State (0–0)	Pittsburgh (1–0) т	Illinois (2–0)	Miami (FL) (2–0)	Texas A&M (3–1)	Texas (3–2)	Arizona (5–1)	Miami (OH) (6–0–1)	Arizona State (5–2)	NC State (7–2)	Baylor (6–3)	Baylor (7–3)	Texas A&M (8–3)	Texas A&M (8–3)	16.
17.	Arizona	Arizona (0–0)	Arizona (1–0) т	LSU (1–1)	Pittsburgh (2–1)	Texas (3–1)	Texas Tech (3–1–1)	NC State (5–1)	Mississippi State (6–1)	Oklahoma State (4–3)	Pittsburgh (7–2)	Texas (7–3)	Texas (7–3)	BYU (7–3–1)	Mississippi State (9–3) т	17.
18.	NC State	Missouri (0–0)	Tennessee (0–0–1) т	USC (0–1)	Arizona State (2–1)	Arizona State (3–1)	Maryland (3–2)	Tulane (5–0)	UCLA (4–1–2)	California (5–2–1)	Oklahoma State (5–3)	Pittsburgh (7–3)	Pittsburgh (7–3)	Florida (8–3)	Texas (8–4) т	18.
19.	Arkansas	Houston (0–1)	Houston (1–1) т	Penn State (1–1)	Texas (2–1)	Kansas (3–1)	Miami (OH) (4–0–1)	Miami (OH) (5–0–1)	Temple (6–0)	Pittsburgh (6–2) т	California (6–2–1)	California (7–2–1)	Wisconsin (7–4)	Arizona (9–2)	Houston (8–3–1)	19.
20.	Texas A&M	Arkansas (0–0) т; Stanford (0–0) т	Stanford (0–1) т	Miami (FL) (1–0)	Arkansas (2–1)	Miami (OH) (3–0–1)	Tulane (4–0)	California (5–1)	San Diego State (5–1) т; Wisconsin (4–3) т	Texas Tech (5–2–1) т	Texas Tech (6–2–1)	Florida (7–3)	BYU (7–3–1)	Pittsburgh (7–4) т; Wisconsin (7–4) т	Tennessee (7–3–2)	20.
	Preseason Aug	Week 1 Sep 9	Week 2 Sep 16	Week 3 Sep 23	Week 4 Sep 30	Week 5 Oct 7	Week 6 Oct 14	Week 7 Oct 21	Week 8 Oct 28	Week 9 Nov 4	Week 10 Nov 11	Week 11 Nov 18	Week 12 Nov 25	Week 13 Dec 2	Week 14 (Final) Jan	
		Dropped: Texas A&M	Dropped: Missouri	Dropped: Arkansas; Houston; Maryland; Stanford; UCLA	Dropped: LSU; Oklahoma State; Tennessee; Wisconsin	Dropped: Illinois; Miami (FL); Pittsburgh	Dropped: Arkansas; Wisconsin	Dropped: Kansas	Dropped: Arizona; California; NC State; Tulane	Dropped: Mississippi State; San Diego State; Temple; UCLA; Wisconsin	Dropped: Arizona State; Texas	Dropped: Oklahoma State; Texas Tech	Dropped: California; Florida	Dropped: Houston	Dropped: Arizona; BYU; Pittsburgh; Wisconsin	

== Final Coaches Poll ==
For the first time, the final UPI Coaches Poll was released after the bowl games, on January 2, 1975.
USC received 27 of the 34 first-place votes; Michigan received four and Alabama three.

Ranking	Team	Conference	Bowl
1	USC	Pac-8	Won Rose, 18–17
2	Alabama	SEC	Lost Orange, 11–13
3	Ohio State	Big Ten	Lost Rose, 17–18
4	Notre Dame	Independent	Won Orange, 13–11
5	Michigan	Big Ten	none
6	Auburn	SEC	Won Gator, 27–3
7	Penn State	Independent	Won Cotton, 41–20
8	Nebraska	Big Eight	Won Sugar, 13–10
9	NC State	ACC	Tied Bluebonnet, 31–31
10	Miami (OH)	Mid-American	Won Tangerine, 21–10
11	Houston	Independent	Tied Bluebonnet, 31–31
12	Florida	SEC	Lost Sugar, 10–13
13	Maryland	ACC	Lost Liberty, 3–7
14	Baylor	Southwest	Lost Cotton, 21–40
15	Texas A&M	Southwest	none
15	Tennessee	SEC	Won Liberty, 7–3
17	Mississippi State	SEC	Won Sun, 26–24
18	Michigan State	Big Ten	none
19	Tulsa	MVC	none

- Only 19 teams received votes
- Teams on probation were ineligible for the Coaches' poll, most notably Oklahoma (11–0).
- Prior to the 1975 season, the Big Ten and Pac-8 conferences allowed only one postseason participant each, for the Rose Bowl.

In the preceding poll in early December, Alabama was first, followed by Ohio State, Michigan, USC, and Auburn; Notre Dame was eighth.
