= 1974 Sun Bowl =

American college football game

North Carolina Tar Heels	Mississippi State Bulldogs
(7–4)	(8–3)
ACC	SEC
24	26
Head coach: Bill Dooley	Head coach: Bob Tyler
	1	2	3	4	Total
North Carolina	7	0	14	3	24
Mississippi State	7	3	10	6	26
- Date: December 28, 1974
- Season: 1974
- Stadium: Sun Bowl
- Location: El Paso, Texas
- MVP: FB Terry Vitrano
- Attendance: 26,035

United States TV coverage
- Network: CBS
- Announcers: Lindsey Nelson; John Sauer; Jane Chastain

The 1974 Sun Bowl was a college football bowl game between the Mississippi State Bulldogs and the North Carolina Tar Heels.

== Background ==
Mississippi State tied for fourth in the Southeastern Conference while the Tar Heels tied for second in the Atlantic Coast Conference. This was the first Sun Bowl for the Bulldogs and the first bowl game since 1963. The Tar Heels had appeared in the Sun Bowl just two years earlier. A freak winter storm the night before the game left frost on the field. The morning warmth of the sun created a rising steam from the field during the first half, thus inspiring the game to be one of three football games to be nicknamed the "Fog Bowl".

== Game summary ==
On the first play, Terry Vitrano ran for 55 yards, which set the tone for the rest of the game.

- Mississippi State – Packer 1 yard touchdown run (Nickels kick)
- North Carolina – Betterson 1 yard touchdown run (Alexander kick)
- Mississippi State – Nickels 24 yard field goal
- North Carolina – Betterson 6 yard touchdown run (Alexander kick)
- Mississippi State – Packer 16 yard touchdown run (Nickels kick)
- North Carolina – Jerome 29 yard touchdown pass from Kupec (Alexander kick)
- Mississippi State – Nickels 32 yard field goal
- North Carolina – Alexander 26 yard field goal
- Mississippi State – Vitrano 2 yard touchdown run (kick failed)

Terry Vitrano rushed for 164 yards on 20 carries with one touchdown en route to being named MVP of the game. His teammate Walter Packer ran for 183 yards on 24 attempts, for two touchdowns. The 455 yards of rushing by the Bulldogs established a new Sun Bowl record.

== Aftermath ==
The Bulldogs returned to the Sun Bowl in 1980 while the Tar Heels reappeared in 1994.

== Statistics ==
Statistics	Mississippi State	North Carolina
First downs	25	22
Rushing yards	455	277
Passing yards	44	125
Total yards	499	402
Passes (C–A–I)	3–8–0	5–15–1
Fumbles–lost	1–1	3–0
Penalties–yards	5–45	2–30
