= 1974 Auburn Tigers football team =

American college football season

1974 Auburn Tigers football

Gator Bowl champion

Gator Bowl, W 27–3 vs. Texas
- Conference: Southeastern Conference

Ranking
- Coaches: No. 6
- AP: No. 8
- Record: 10–2 (4–2 SEC)
- Head coach: Ralph Jordan (24th season)
- Offensive coordinator: Doug Barfield (1st season)
- Home stadium: Jordan–Hare Stadium; Legion Field

1974 Southeastern Conference football standings
	Conf.					Overall
Team	W		L		T	W		L		T
No. 5 Alabama $	6	–	0	–	0	11	–	1	–	0
No. 8 Auburn	4	–	2	–	0	10	–	2	–	0
Georgia	4	–	2	–	0	6	–	6	–	0
No. 17 Mississippi State	3	–	3	–	0	9	–	3	–	0
No. 15 Florida	3	–	3	–	0	8	–	4	–	0
Kentucky	3	–	3	–	0	6	–	5	–	0
No. 20 Tennessee	2	–	3	–	1	7	–	3	–	2
Vanderbilt	2	–	3	–	1	7	–	3	–	2
LSU	2	–	4	–	0	5	–	5	–	1
Ole Miss	0	–	6	–	0	3	–	8	–	0
$ – Conference champion; Rankings from AP Poll

The 1974 Auburn Tigers football team under the leadership of head coach Ralph Jordan completed the regular season with a record of 9–2, earning them an invitation to the Gator Bowl against Texas, which they won by a score of 27–3. They completed the season with a record of 10–2 and were ranked #8 in the AP poll and #6 in the UPI.

Four players were named all-SEC first team for 1974: defensive end Rusty Deen, linebacker Ken Bernich, safety Mike Fuller, and center Lee Gross.

== Schedule ==
Date	Opponent	Rank	Site	Result	Attendance	Source
September 14	Louisville*		Legion Field; Birmingham, AL	W 16–3	25,000	
September 21	Chattanooga*		Jordan-Hare Stadium; Auburn, AL	W 52–7	42,000	
September 28	No. 14 Tennessee		Jordan-Hare Stadium; Auburn, AL (rivalry)	W 21–0	64,293	
October 4	at No. 16 Miami (FL)*	No. 11	Miami Orange Bowl; Miami, FL	W 3–0	33,490	
October 12	Kentucky	No. 10	Jordan-Hare Stadium; Auburn, AL	W 31–13	52,111	
October 19	Georgia Tech*	No. 5	Jordan-Hare Stadium; Auburn, AL (rivalry)	W 31–22	62,907	
October 26	Florida State*^{†}	No. 5	Jordan-Hare Stadium; Auburn, AL	W 38–6	58,709	
November 2	at No. 11 Florida	No. 5	Florida Field; Gainesville, FL (rivalry)	L 14–25	64,912	
November 9	at Mississippi State	No. 10	Mississippi Veterans Memorial Stadium; Jackson, MS	W 24–20	38,000	
November 16	Georgia	No. 7	Jordan-Hare Stadium; Auburn, AL (rivalry)	W 17–13	64,748	
November 29	vs. No. 2 Alabama	No. 7	Legion Field; Birmingham, AL (Iron Bowl)	L 13–17	71,224	
December 30	vs. No. 11 Texas*	No. 6	Gator Bowl Stadium; Jacksonville, FL (Gator Bowl)	W 27–3	63,811	
*Non-conference game; ^{†}Homecoming; Rankings from AP Poll released prior to the game
