= 1974 Tangerine Bowl =

American college football game

Miami Redskins	Georgia Bulldogs
(9–0–1)	(6–5)
MAC	SEC
21	10
Head coach: Dick Crum	Head coach: Vince Dooley
AP / Coaches; 15 / 13
	1	2	3	4	Total
Miami	14	7	0	0	21
Georgia	3	0	7	0	10
- Date: December 21, 1974
- Season: 1974
- Stadium: Tangerine Bowl
- Location: Orlando, Florida
- MVP: Sherman Smith, Miami (back); Brad Cousino & John Roudabush, Miami (linemen)
- Referee: Robert Aillet (SEC; split crew: SEC, MAC)
- Attendance: 20,246

United States TV coverage
- Network: Mizlou

The 1974 Tangerine Bowl was a college football bowl game played on December 21, 1974, at the Tangerine Bowl stadium in Orlando, Florida. The game featured the Georgia Bulldogs and the Miami Redskins (located in Oxford, Ohio and now nicknamed the RedHawks).

== Background ==
Miami was champion of the Mid-American Conference (MAC) for the second straight year, while having a season with no losses for the second straight year as well, earning another Tangerine trip. Georgia finished tied for second in the Southeastern Conference (SEC), despite losing three of their last four games. This was their first Tangerine Bowl appearance.

Delays with stadium renovation work had led to the previous Tangerine Bowl game being played in Gainesville; this year the game returned to Orlando, where it has remained since.

== Game summary ==
On the first play of scrimmage, the Bulldogs fumbled the ball and Miami recovered it at the Georgia 25. Rob Carpenter scored on a one-yard touchdown run to give Miami a 7–0 lead. Despite driving into Miami territory, Georgia settled for an Allan Leavitt field goal that narrowed the lead to 7–3. Sherman Smith threw a 7-yard touchdown pass to Ricky Taylor to make it 14–3. A fumble at the Bulldogs 22 gave the ball back to the Redskins, who capitalized with a touchdown run by Smith to make it 21–3. All Georgia could do in the second half was make the score 21–10 on a Ray Goff touchdown plunge, but Georgia could not get any more points.

== Aftermath ==
Miami returned to the Tangerine Bowl the following year, after winning their third straight MAC title. Georgia returned to the Tangerine Bowl ten years later; by then the game had changed names and was the 1984 Florida Citrus Bowl.

== Statistics ==
Statistics	Miami (Ohio)	Georgia
First downs	18	17
Rushing yards	228	74
Passing yards	14	210
Total yards	242	284
Return yardage	0	0
Fumbles–fumbles lost	3–3	5–2
Punts–average	5–36.0	4–30.0
Penalties–penalty yards	3–25	2–24
