= 1974 Tennessee Volunteers football team =

American college football season

1974 Tennessee Volunteers football

Liberty Bowl champion

Liberty Bowl, W 7–3 vs. Maryland
- Conference: Southeastern Conference

Ranking
- Coaches: No. 15
- AP: No. 20
- Record: 7–3–2 (2–3–1 SEC)
- Head coach: Bill Battle (5th season)
- Offensive coordinator: Ray Trail
- Defensive coordinator: Larry Jones
- Captains: Condredge Holloway; Jim Watts
- Home stadium: Neyland Stadium

1974 Southeastern Conference football standings
| | Conf. | | | | | Overall |
| Team | W | | L | | T | W | | L | | T |
|---|---|---|---|---|---|---|---|---|---|---|
| No. 5 Alabama $ | 6 | – | 0 | – | 0 | 11 | – | 1 | – | 0 |
| No. 8 Auburn | 4 | – | 2 | – | 0 | 10 | – | 2 | – | 0 |
| Georgia | 4 | – | 2 | – | 0 | 6 | – | 6 | – | 0 |
| No. 17 Mississippi State | 3 | – | 3 | – | 0 | 9 | – | 3 | – | 0 |
| No. 15 Florida | 3 | – | 3 | – | 0 | 8 | – | 4 | – | 0 |
| Kentucky | 3 | – | 3 | – | 0 | 6 | – | 5 | – | 0 |
| No. 20 Tennessee | 2 | – | 3 | – | 1 | 7 | – | 3 | – | 2 |
| Vanderbilt | 2 | – | 3 | – | 1 | 7 | – | 3 | – | 2 |
| LSU | 2 | – | 4 | – | 0 | 5 | – | 5 | – | 1 |
| Ole Miss | 0 | – | 6 | – | 0 | 3 | – | 8 | – | 0 |
$ – Conference champion; Rankings from AP Poll

The 1974 Tennessee Volunteers football team (variously "Tennessee", "UT" or the "Vols") represented the University of Tennessee in the 1974 NCAA Division I football season. Playing as a member of the Southeastern Conference (SEC), the team was led by head coach Bill Battle, in his fifth year, and played their home games at Neyland Stadium in Knoxville, Tennessee. They finished the season with a record of seven wins, three losses and two ties (7–3–2 overall, 2–3–1 in the SEC). At season's end, Tennessee won the Liberty Bowl over Maryland. For the season, the Volunteers offense scored 211 points while the defense allowed 181 points.

== Schedule ==
| Date | Opponent | Rank | Site | TV | Result | Attendance | Source |
|---|---|---|---|---|---|---|---|
| September 7 | No. 12 UCLA* | No. 16 | Neyland Stadium; Knoxville, TN | ABC | T 17–17 | 57,560 | |
| September 21 | Kansas* | No. 17 | Neyland Stadium; Knoxville, TN | | W 17–3 | 71,610–72,178 | |
| September 28 | at Auburn | No. 14 | Jordan–Hare Stadium; Auburn, AL | | L 0–21 | 64,293 | |
| October 5 | Tulsa* | | Neyland Stadium; Knoxville, TN | | W 17–10 | 67,256 | |
| October 12 | at LSU | | Tiger Stadium; Baton Rouge, LA | | L 10–20 | 67,907 | |
| October 19 | No. 4 Alabama | | Neyland Stadium; Knoxville, TN (Third Saturday in October) | | L 6–28 | 74,286 | |
| October 26 | Clemson* | | Neyland Stadium; Knoxville, TN | | W 29–28 | 66,334 | |
| November 9 | Memphis State* | | Neyland Stadium; Knoxville, TN | | W 34–6 | 68,738 | |
| November 16 | Ole Miss | | Memphis Memorial Stadium; Memphis, TN (rivalry) | | W 29–17 | 50,515 | |
| November 23 | Kentucky^{†} | | Neyland Stadium; Knoxville, TN (Battle for the Barrel) | | W 24–7 | 72,828 | |
| November 30 | at Vanderbilt | | Dudley Field; Nashville, TN | | T 21–21 | 35,300 | |
| December 16 | vs. Maryland* | | Memphis Memorial Stadium; Memphis, TN (Liberty Bowl) | ABC | W 7–3 | 51,284 | |
*Non-conference game; ^{†}Homecoming; Rankings from AP Poll released prior to the game

== Roster ==
1974 Tennessee Volunteers football team roster
Players
Coaches
Offense

| Pos. | # | Name | Class |
|---|---|---|---|
| OT | 59 | Dave Brady | So |
| OT | 79 | Mike Caldwell | Jr |
| WR | 81 | Tim Fitchpatrick | Jr |
| G | 54 | Joe Mills | Sr |
| C | 52 | Paul Johnson | Jr |
| G | 67 | Mickey Marvin | So |
| WR | 21 | Stanley Morgan | So |
| QB | 4 | Pat Ryan | So |
| TE | 23 | Tommy West | Jr |
| WR | 17 | John Yarbrough | Jr |

Defense

| Pos. | # | Name | Class |
|---|---|---|---|
| DB | 14 | Bill Cole | Jr |
| DE | 39 | Kevin Davis | So |
| DB | 10 | Mike Mauck | So |
| DE | 57 | Ron McCartney | Jr |
| DT | 72 | David Page | Jr |
| DB | 30 | David Parsons | So |
| LB | 45 | Steve Poole | Jr |
| DB | 29 | Russ Rabenstein | Jr |
| LB | 50 | Andy Spiva | So |
| DB | 40 | Ernie Ward | Jr |

Special teams

| Pos. | # | Name | Class |

Head coach

- Bill Battle

Coordinators/assistant coaches

Legend

- (C) Team captain
- (S) Suspended
- (I) Ineligible
- Injured
- Redshirt

== Team players drafted into the NFL ==
Despite being drafted by the National Football League, Condredge Holloway opted to play in the Canadian Football League. Holloway signed a contract with the Ottawa Rough Riders.

| Player | Position | Round | Pick | NFL club |
|---|---|---|---|---|
| Neil Clabo | Punter | 10 | 258 | Minnesota Vikings |
| Condredge Holloway | Quarterback | 12 | 306 | New England Patriots |
| Ricky Townsend | Kicker | 13 | 314 | New York Giants |
| Paul Careathers | Running back | 15 | 389 | Oakland Raiders |
