= 1946 Oklahoma Sooners football team =

American college football season

1946 Oklahoma Sooners football

Big 6 co-champion Gator Bowl champion

Gator Bowl, W 34–13 vs. NC State
- Conference: Big Six Conference

Ranking
- AP: No. 14
- Record: 8–3 (4–1 Big 6)
- Head coach: Jim Tatum (1st season)
- Offensive scheme: Split-T
- Captain: Jim Tyree
- Home stadium: Memorial Stadium

1946 Big Six Conference football standings
	Conf.					Overall
Team	W		L		T	W		L		T
Kansas +	4	–	1	–	0	7	–	2	–	1
No. 14 Oklahoma +	4	–	1	–	0	8	–	3	–	0
Missouri	3	–	2	–	0	5	–	4	–	1
Nebraska	3	–	2	–	0	3	–	6	–	0
Iowa State	1	–	4	–	0	2	–	6	–	1
Kansas State	0	–	5	–	0	0	–	9	–	0
+ – Conference co-champions; Rankings from AP Poll

The 1946 Oklahoma Sooners football team represented the University of Oklahoma as a member of the Big Six Conference during the 1946 college football season. Led by Jim Tatum in his first and only season as head coach, the Sooners compiled an overall record of 8–3 with a mark of 4–1 in conference play, sharing the Big 6 title with Kansas. Oklahoma was invited to the Gator Bowl, where they defeated NC State. With the aid of first-year backfield coach Bud Wilkinson, who became the team's head coach the following year, Tatum installed the new split-T offense.

The team ranked second nationally in total defense, giving up an average of only 141.7 yards per game. They also led the country in rushing defense, giving up an average of only 58.0 rushing yards per game. On offense, the Sooners ranked sixth nationally in rushing with an average of 235.4 yards per game and registered the highest single-game offensive total in games involving major teams with 664 yards against Oklahoma A&M.

Oklahoma back Joe Golding ranked fourth nationally with 902 rushing yards on 126 carries, an average of 7.16 yards per carry. Golding had played for Oklahoma in 1941 but missed four years while serving as an infantryman in the European theatre of World War II, receiving the Combat Infantry badge, the Silver Star, Bronze Star, and Purple Heart. In an October 19, 1946 game against Kansas State, Golding broke or tied modern Oklahoma records with an 81-yard touchdown run, an average of 23.4 yards per carry, 164 net rushing yards, and three rushing touchdowns.

Nine Oklahoma players received honors from the Associated Press (AP) or United Press (UP) on the 1946 All-Big Six Conference football team: Golding at back (AP-1, UP-1); tackle Wade Walker (AP-1, UP-1); guard Plato Andros (AP-1, UP-1); center John Rapacz (AP-1, UP-1); back Jack Mitchell (AP-2, UP-2); tackle Homer Paine (AP-2, UP-2); guard Buddy Burris (AP-2, UP-2); end Jim Tyree (AP-2, UP-3); and back Eddy Davis (UP-3).

== Schedule ==
Date	Opponent	Rank	Site	Result	Attendance	Source
September 28	at Army*		Michie Stadium; West Point, NY	L 7–21	25,500	
October 5	Texas A&M*		Memorial Stadium; Norman, OK	W 10–7	27,000	
October 12	vs. No. 1 Texas*		Cotton Bowl; Dallas, TX (Red River Shootout)	L 13–20	> 50,000	
October 19	Kansas State	No. 13	Memorial Stadium; Norman, OK	W 28–7	> 26,000	
October 26	at Iowa State	No. 14	Clyde Williams Stadium; Ames, IA	W 63–0	15,176	
November 2	at TCU*	No. 14	Amon G. Carter Stadium; Fort Worth, TX	W 14–12	6,000	
November 9	at Kansas	No. 16	Memorial Stadium; Lawrence, KS	L 13–16	15,000	
November 16	Missouri^{†}		Memorial Stadium; Norman, OK (rivalry)	W 27–6	33,431	
November 23	Nebraska	No. 18	Memorial Stadium; Norman, OK (rivalry)	W 27–6	25,000	
November 30	at Oklahoma A&M*	No. 17	Lewis Field; Stillwater, OK (Bedlam)	W 73–12	18,500	
January 1, 1947	vs. No. 18 NC State*	No. 14	Fairfield Stadium; Jacksonville, FL (Gator Bowl)	W 34–13	17,000	
*Non-conference game; ^{†}Homecoming; Rankings from AP Poll released prior to the game

== Rankings ==
Ranking movements Legend: ██ Increase in ranking ██ Decrease in ranking — = Not ranked
	Week								
Poll	1	2	3	4	5	6	7	8	Final
AP	—	13	14	14	16	—	18	18	14

== Recruiting ==
Tatum launched an intensive recruiting drive, largely focused at veterans returning from the Second World War. He held open tryouts that attracted an estimated 600 prospects. He largely rejected the players from the previous season and focused instead on building a new team. The recruiting effort targeted returning servicemen who had been athletes at other colleges before the war, rival universities, and graduating high school seniors. Tatum's recruiting paid dividends, and nine of his players would earn All-American honors at Oklahoma: Plato Andros, Buddy Burris, Jack Mitchell, Jim Owens, John Rapacz, Darrell Royal, George Thomas, Wade Walker, and Stan West. Burris became the first Sooner to receive that honor three times.

== Coaching staff ==
In 1945, head coach Dewey Luster missed part of the season due to illness, and had struggled to recruit quality players during the Second World War when many University of Oklahoma athletes were serving overseas. His Sooners finished the year with a 5–5 record that included a finale loss, 0–47, to Oklahoma A&M (now known as Oklahoma State). At the conclusion of the 1945 season, Luster tendered his resignation.

Athletic director Jap Haskell recommended Jim Tatum to University of Oklahoma president George Cross, and other applicants considered by the Board of Regents included Bear Bryant and Harold Drew. Haskell had served in the U.S. Navy during the war, and Tatum was an assistant coach for the Navy's Iowa Pre-Flight School football team under head coach Don Faurot, the inventor of the split-T formation. Prior to that, Tatum had coached at his own alma mater, North Carolina. Bud Wilkinson, who had been a colleague of Tatum's at Iowa Pre-Flight, was hired as Oklahoma's new backfield coach. Walter Driskill, the former line coach at Colorado and Wyoming, was given that same role at Oklahoma. Tatum and Wilkinson installed the split-T, the innovative new offensive system they had learned under Don Faurot during the war.

== Game summaries ==
=== Army ===
The season-opener was against Army, the defending national champions and a 38-point favorite. The game was played at West Point, NY. 25,000 attended including the President of the United States, Harry Truman. The Sooners scored in the second quarter on a blocked punt, but Army equalized shortly before halftime. In the third quarter, Army blocked an Oklahoma punt on the Sooners' 15-yard line and scored four plays later. Shortly after, the Sooners recovered a fumble on the Army 18-yard line. On fourth down at the Cadets' nine-yard line, Dave Wallace, about to be sacked, threw a lateral, but the ball was deflected, and Arnold Tucker returned it 85 yards for Army's final touchdown. The Cadets won, 21–7, and went on to finish the season ranked number-two, with no losses and one tie in a legendary game against first-ranked Notre Dame.

=== Texas A&M ===
In the first quarter against Texas A&M, the Sooners drove 84-yards to the Aggies' one-yard line, including a 42-yard pass from Wallace to end Warren Giese, but the A&M defense held. In the second quarter, Oklahoma again drove into A&M territory, but a pass was intercepted in the end zone. The Aggies then attempted to punt, but Norman McNabb blocked the kick and it was recovered on the A&M six-yard line. On fourth down, Jack Mitchell rushed for a score, and Wallace made the extra point. In the third quarter, Marion Flanagan returned a punt 72 yards to equalize the score. The Sooners blocked an Aggie field goal attempted in the fourth quarter, and then mounted a drive to the A&M seven-yard line. After being stalled by the Aggie defense and incurring a delay of game penalty, Wallace made good a short field goal attempt for the go-ahead score, 10–7.

=== Texas (Red River Shootout) ===
First-ranked Texas entered the game with a 3–0 record, and had decisively beaten Missouri, 42–0; Colorado, 76–0; and Oklahoma A&M, 54–6. The Longhorns jumped out to a lead, 14–0. In the second quarter, Wallace intercepted a pass from Tom Landry on the Oklahoma 44-yard line, and he then mounted a drive that ended with an 11-yard touchdown pass. The extra point attempt failed. Shortly thereafter, Wallace made another interception on the Longhorns' 39-yard line, but Darrell Royal soon threw an interception of his own in the Texas end zone. In the fourth quarter, Joe Golding intercepted a pass and returned it 99 yards for a touchdown that tied the school record set the previous year. Texas then engineered a 75-yard drive for the final touchdown and won, 20–13.

=== Kansas State ===
Kansas State then traveled to Norman, which marked the start to Oklahoma's conference schedule. Golding scored first with a 43-yard breakaway. In the second quarter, Kansas State equalized. Oklahoma pulled away with a third-quarter and two fourth-quarter touchdowns, with the final tally coming after a Royal interception. Immediately following that turnover, Golding rushed for an 81-yard touchdown.

=== Iowa State ===
Oklahoma routed Iowa State at their own homecoming, 63–0, which is the school's worst defeat in history. The Sooners recorded 398 rushing yards, 130 passing yards, and 204 return yards. Iowa State managed just four first downs, 91 rushing yards, and 43 passing yards.

=== TCU ===
Oklahoma was projected as a two-touchdown favorite against TCU. In a driving rainstorm, Oklahoma advanced to the TCU nine-yard line. Royal attempted a lateral, but Weldon Edwards knocked it down and Harold Kilman picked it up, ran 15 yards, then lateraled to Edwards. He carried it 70 yards to take the lead for the Horned Frogs, 6–0. The Sooners drove to the Frogs' 12-yard line, but fumbled away the water-logged ball. TCU failed to advance and kicked a short punt to their 28-yard line. The Sooners rushed on five plays for the score, and with the extra-point, took the lead, 7–6. At the start of the second half, Mitchell returned the kickoff 80 yards to the TCU 11-yard line. The teams traded fumbles, before the Frogs recovered a second Sooners' turnover. TCU was forced to punted and Mitchell returned it from the Frogs' 40-yard line. Lindy Berry tackled Mitchell at the goal line, but he crossed into the end zone. Wallace kicked the extra point. TCU blocked a fourth quarter punt from the Oklahoma 25-yard line, and Doug Brightwell ran it in for the game's final score. Oklahoma held against two more scoring threat by TCU and won, 14–12.

=== Kansas ===
Oklahoma traveled to Lawrence, Kansas to face the Jayhawks in another driving rainstorm. In the second quarter, Kansas took the lead before Golding rushed 65 yards to even the score, 6–6. Soon after, Kansas converted an Oklahoma fumble to take the lead again. In the third quarter, Golding rushed 14 yards for another touchdown and Wallace tied the game with the extra point. In the final 1:15, the Jayhawks' kicker made good his career first field goal attempt, and Kansas won, 16–13.

=== Missouri ===
Against Missouri, Oklahoma scored several plays after recovering a fumble. Buddy Burris then blocked a Missouri punt, and Homer Paine recovered it on the Tigers' 12-yard line. The Sooners then executed a halfback option, with Mitchell lateraling to Wallace who passed to Giese for a touchdown. Wallace made the extra point and the Sooners led, 14–0. On their next possession, Missouri fumbled again and Oklahoma again capitalized with a score. In the second quarter, Golding intercepted a Missouri pass and returned it 75 yards to the Tigers' 17-yard line. The Sooners scored two plays later to take a 27–0 lead. In the final quarter, Tatum fielded his alternate lineup, against which Missouri engineered a 71-yard drive for a touchdown, and the final score, 27-6.

=== Nebraska ===
Oklahoma, with a 3–1 conference record, was tied for the lead in the Big Six with Kansas, Missouri, and Nebraska. Against the Cornhuskers, Oklahoma scored first before Nebraska equalized, 6–6, but those were their only points of the game. Eddie Davis, Golding, and Mitchell each scored rushing touchdowns and Royal threw for a passing touchdown.

With the 27–6 victory over Nebraska, Oklahoma ended its conference schedule with a 4–1 record. Since Kansas had defeated Missouri, 20–19, on Thanksgiving, Oklahoma shared the Big Six Conference Championship the Jayhawks.

=== Oklahoma A&M (Bedlam Series) ===
Oklahoma traveled to Stillwater to face in-state rivals Oklahoma A&M (now known as Oklahoma State). The Aggies' star halfback, Bob Fenimore, missed the game due to an injury. The Sooners won 73–12, with Golding scoring three of their ten touchdowns.

=== NC State (Gator Bowl) ===
Oklahoma, with a final ranking of number-14, accepted an invitation to the second annual Gator Bowl to play 18th-ranked North Carolina State on January 1, 1947. During the regular season, the Wolfpack had allowed an average of 6.7 points per game and finished with an 8–2 record.

The Sooners received the opening kickoff and drove 65 yards for a touchdown. NC State responded by scoring on a 42-yard pass. In the second quarter, Oklahoma scored three rushing touchdowns and entered halftime with a 27–7 advantage. In the third quarter, a 67-yard Wolfpack drive was capped by an eight-yard touchdown run. In the final quarter, the Sooners took over on downs on their 36-yard line and advanced downfield to score on a 15-yard option pass. The final result was 34–13 in Oklahoma's favor.

During the game, Oklahoma recorded 195 rushing and 74 passing yards, while NC State compiled 136 rushing and 103 passing yards. Sooners' halfback Joe Golding rushed for 91 yards on 12 attempts and was named the most valuable player.

== After the season ==
Individual honors were bestowed upon several Oklahoma players, and at the time, the 1946 team included the most all-conference honorees to date. First-team All-American honors were granted to guards Plato Andros and Buddy Burris, and center John Rapacz. The All-Big Six first team included those three as well as end Warren Giese, back Joe Golding, and tackles Homer Paine and Wade Walker.

After the Gator Bowl, university president Cross learned that Tatum had paid each player $120 ($1,981, adjusted for inflation), despite Cross's order not to do so. He later learned that $60,000 ($990,614 in inflation-adjusted terms) was unaccounted for in the athletic department budget. As a result, athletic director Jap Haskell was fired. Tatum accepted an offer to coach at Maryland, and Cross promoted Bud Wilkinson into the head coaching position.

=== NFL draft ===
The following players were drafted into the National Football League following the season.

Round	Pick	Player	Position	NFL team
3	15	John Rapacz	Center	Pittsburgh Steelers
5	31	Buddy Burris	Guard	Green Bay Packers
11	90	Dave Wallace	Back	Chicago Cardinals
12	101	Charley Sarratt	Back	Philadelphia Eagles
14	122	Jack Mitchell	Back	Green Bay Packers
22	201	Wade Walker	Tackle	Chicago Cardinals
27	255	Bill Morris	End	Chicago Bears
