= List of Kansas Jayhawks in the NFL draft =

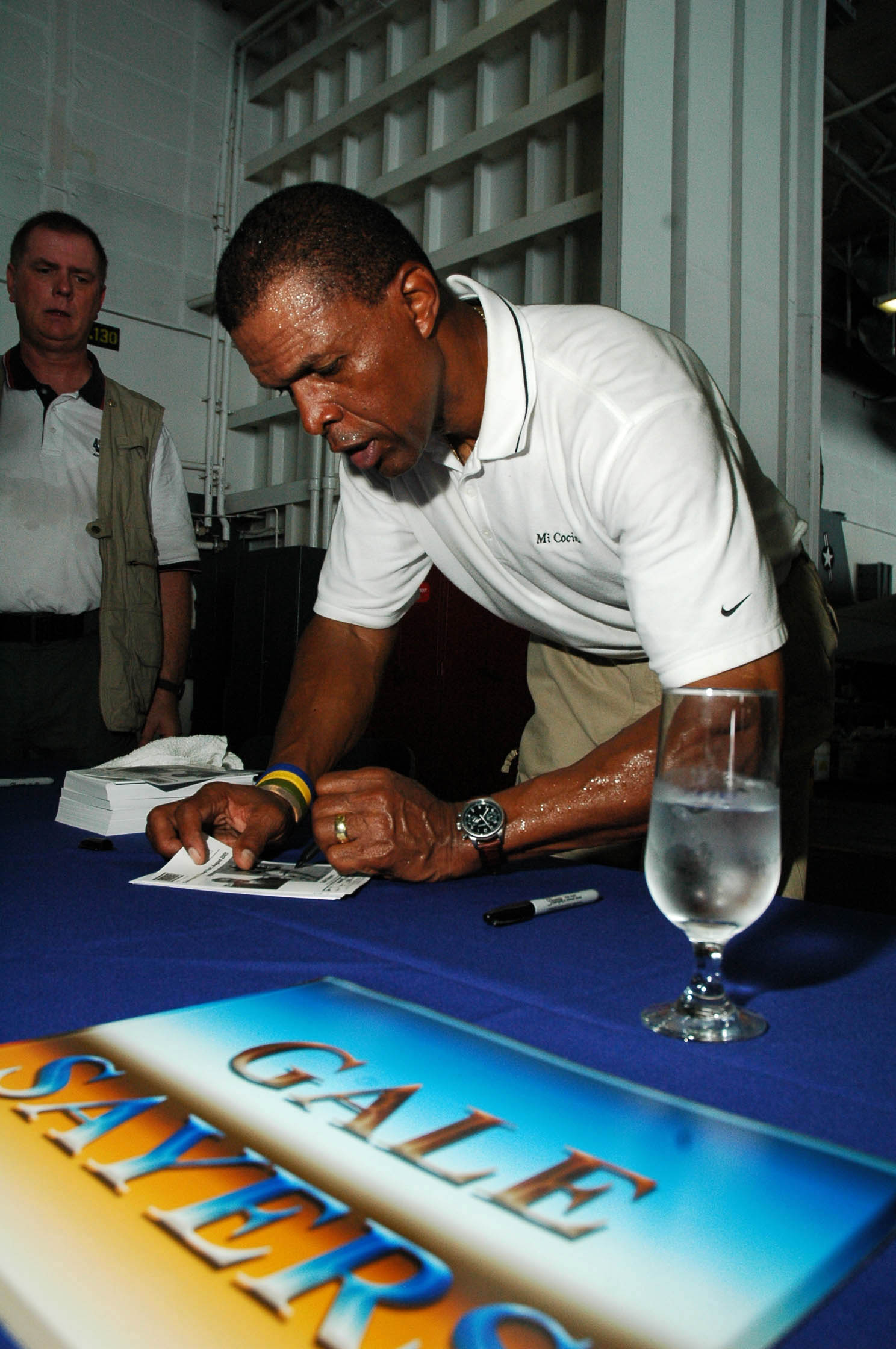
Gale Sayers was drafted 4th overall by the Chicago Bears in the 1965 NFL draft.

The University of Kansas Jayhawks football team has had 175 players drafted into the National Football League (NFL). (Note: The history of the AFL is officially recognized by the NFL and so this list includes the AFL draft (1960–1966) and the common draft (1967–1969).) (Note: The AAFC merged with the NFL at the end of the 1949 season and so this list includes the AAFC draft (1946–1949).) KU has seen nine players taken in the first round, including six top-10 picks: Gale Sayers, John Riggins, Ray Evans, Mike Butler, John Hadl, and David Verser. Sayers, a College and Pro Football Hall of Famer, was the highest pick from KU as the fourth overall pick in the 1965 NFL draft. Nine different Jayhawks have been drafted in the first round, Aqib Talib, who was drafted with the 20th overall selection in the 2008 NFL draft is the most recent Jayhawk to be drafted in the first round.

Through the annual NFL draft each NFL franchise gets the chance to add new players to their teams. The current draft rules were established in 2009. The team with the worst record the previous year gets to pick first, then the next-worst team picks second, and so on. Teams that were not in the playoffs receive their draft order by their regular-season record. If 2 or more non-playoff teams have the same record the tie breaker used is their strength of schedule. Playoff teams receive their draft order after all the non-playoff teams, based on their round of elimination (wild card, division, conference, and Super Bowl).

In 1944 the All-America Football Conference was established and it began play in 1946 in direct competition with the NFL. From 1946 to 1949 the two leagues fiercely competed for the top college football prospects with each league holding their own drafts, before the AAFC finally merged with the NFL at the end of the 1949 season.

Like the AAFC earlier, the American Football League (AFL) operated in direct competition with the NFL and held a separate draft. This led to a massive bidding war over top prospects between the two leagues. As part of the merger agreement on June 8, 1966, the two leagues would hold a multiple round "common draft". Once the AFL officially merged with the NFL in 1970, the common draft simply became the NFL draft.

Sixteen former Jayhawks who were drafted have been selected to a Pro Bowl or AFL All-Star Game. Twelve former Jayhawks who were drafted have won a championship with their respective teams, one was named MVP, John Riggins in Super Bowl XVII.

== Key ==
| B | Back | K | Kicker | NT | Nose tackle |
| C | Center | LB | Linebacker | DB | Defensive back |
| P | Punter | HB | Halfback | DE | Defensive end |
| QB | Quarterback | WR | Wide receiver | DT | Defensive tackle |
| RB | Running back | G | Guard | E | End |
| T | Offensive tackle | TE | Tight end | FB | Fullback |

| * | Selected to a Pro Bowl or AFL All-Star Game |
| † | Won an NFL championship |
| ‡ | Selected to a Pro Bowl or AFL All-Star Game and won an NFL championship |
| ! | College Hall of Famer |
| ± | NFL Hall of Famer |

== Selections ==
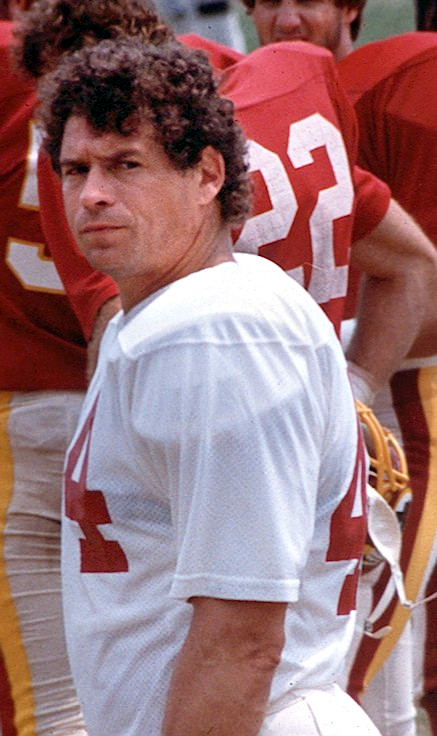
John Riggins was drafted 6th overall by the Cleveland Browns in the 1971 NFL draft.

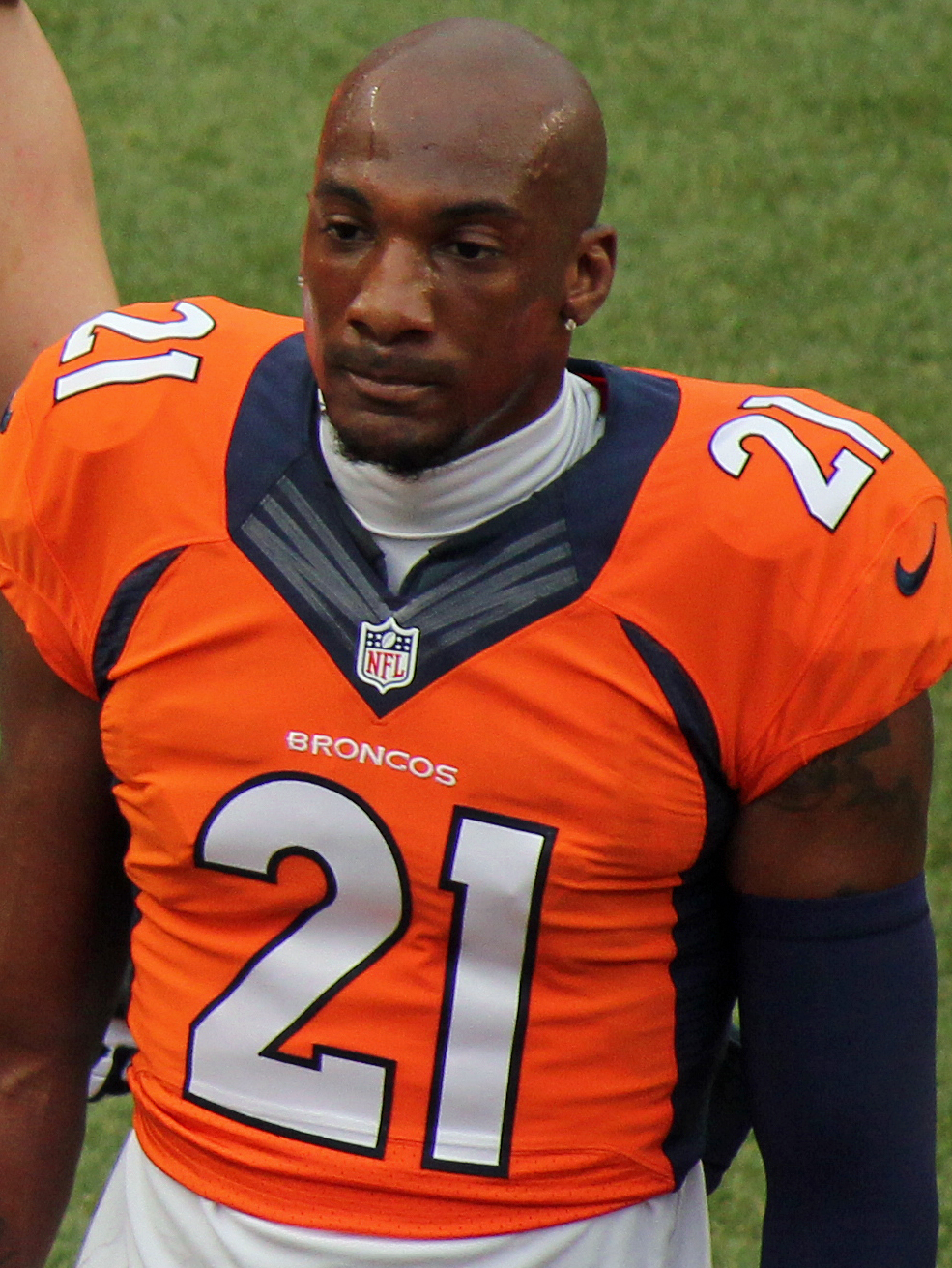
Aqib Talib was drafted 20th overall by the Tampa Bay Buccaneers in the 2008 NFL draft.

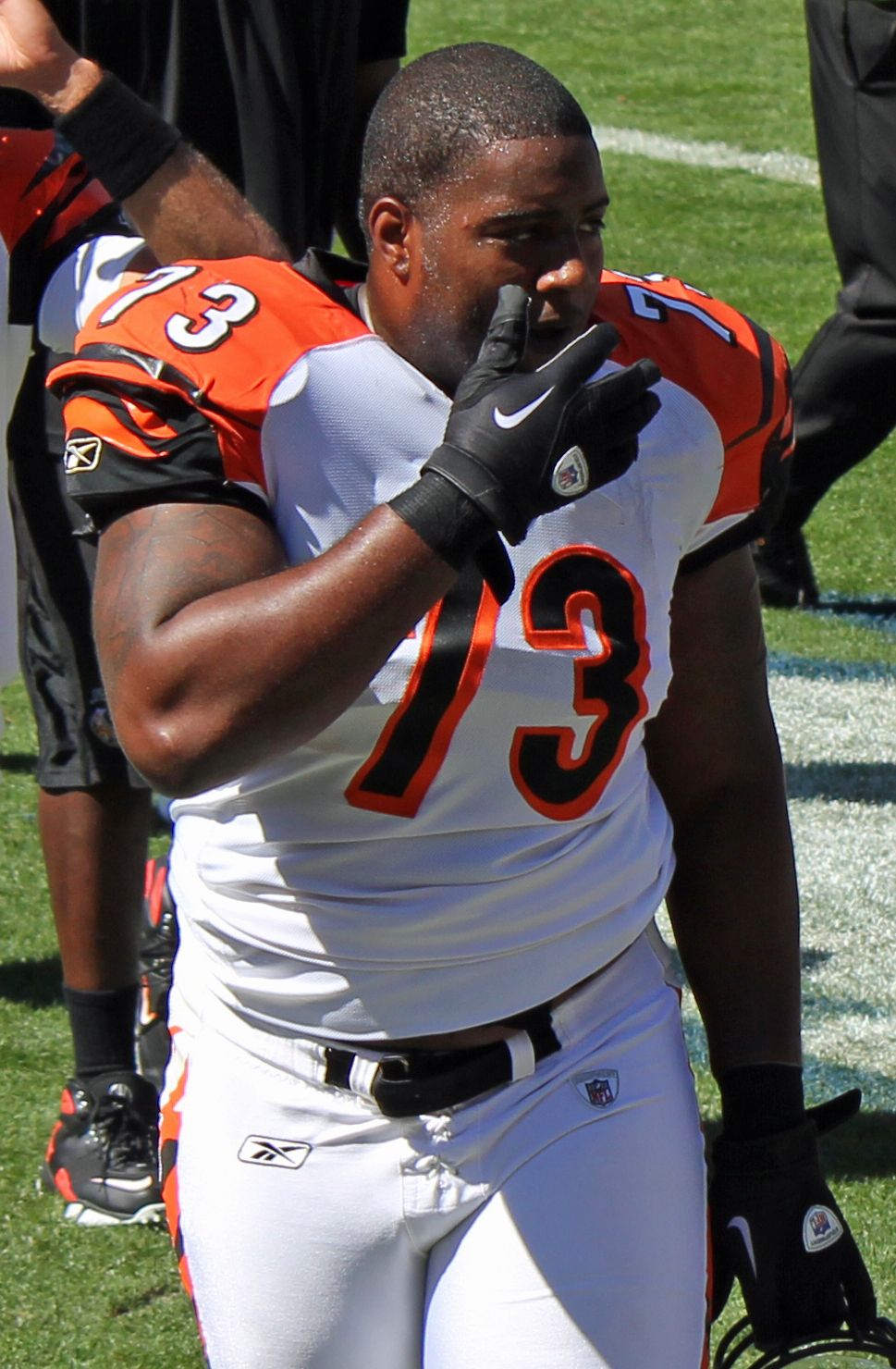
Anthony Collins was drafted 112th overall by the Cincinnati Bengals in the 2008 NFL draft.

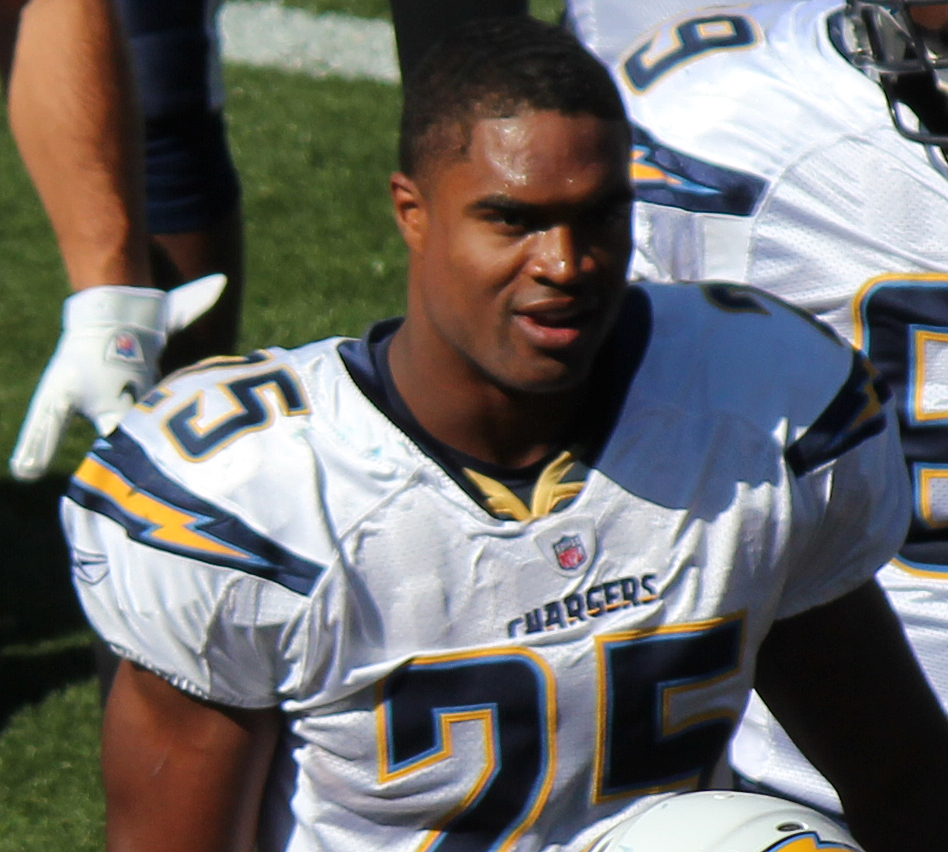
Darrell Stuckey was drafted 110th overall by the San Diego Chargers in the 2010 NFL draft.

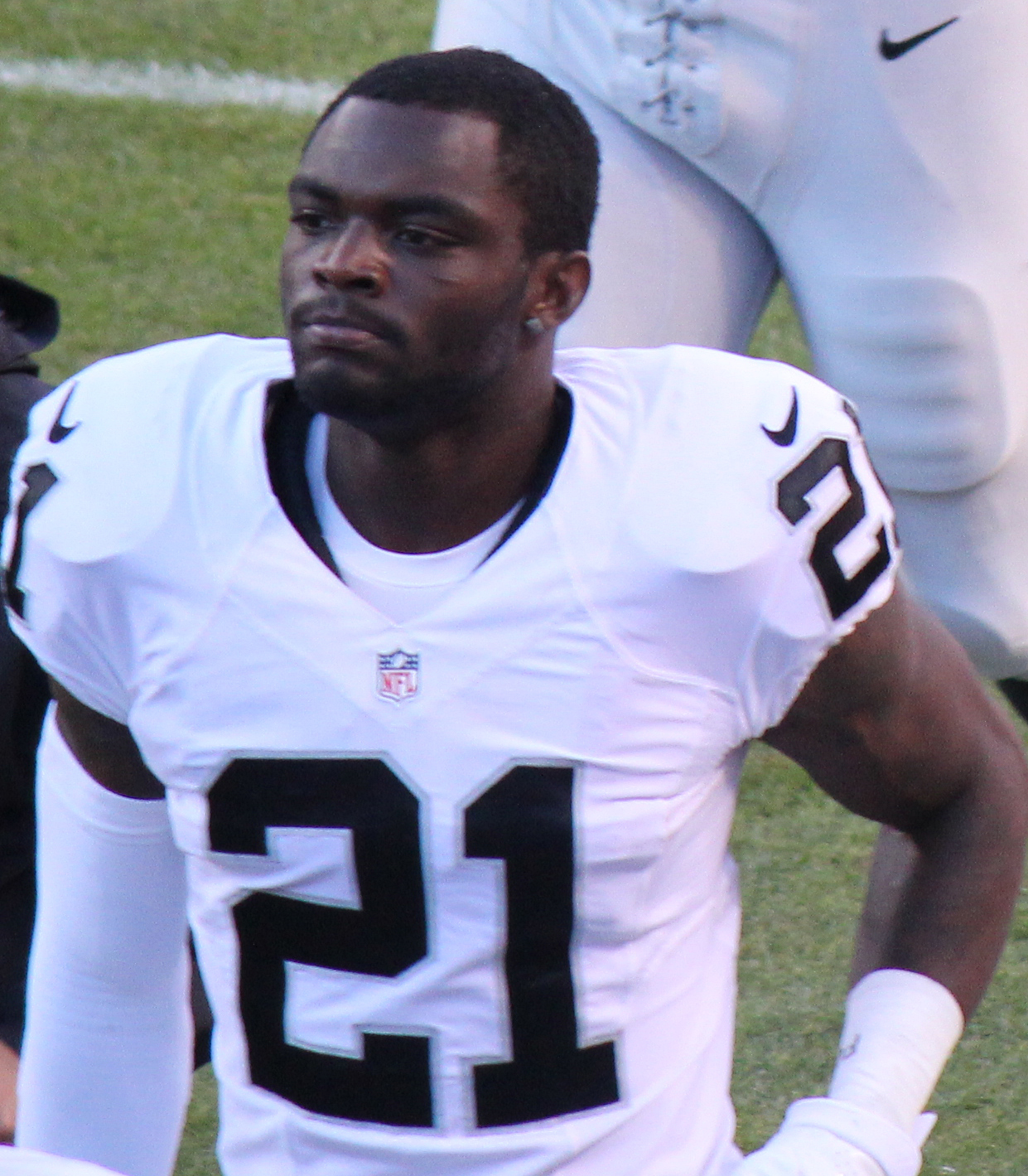
Dexter McDonald was selected by the Oakland Raiders in the 2015 NFL draft.

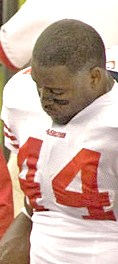
Moran Norris was selected by the New Orleans Saints as the 115th overall draft pick in the 2001 NFL draft.

| Year (Note: From 1960 through 1966, teams with a superscript AFL denotes a player drafted in the AFL draft and teams with a superscript NFL denotes a player drafted in the NFL draft.) (Note: From 1946 through 1949, teams with a superscript AAFC denotes a player drafted in the All-America Football Conference and teams with a superscript NFL denotes a player drafted in the NFL draft.) | Round | Pick | Overall | Player | Team (Note: This is the team that drafted the player, not their most recent team.) | Position | Notes |
|---|---|---|---|---|---|---|---|
| 1938 | 9 | 6 | 76 | Clarence Douglass | Detroit Lions | B | — |
| 1939 | 18 | 1 | 161 | Dave Shirk | Pittsburgh Pirates | E | — |
| 1939 | 19 | 35 | 175 | Ferrell Anderson | Brooklyn Dodgers | G | — |
| 1940 | 14 | 3 | 123 | Bill Bunson | Philadelphia Eagles | B | — |
| 1942 | 9 | 2 | 72 | Hubert Ulrich | Cleveland Rams | E | — |
| 1942 | 16 | 7 | 147 | Ralph Miller | Brooklyn Dodgers | B | Hall of fame basketball coach |
| 1944 | 1 | 9 | 9 | Ray Evans^{|} | Chicago Bears | B | College Football Hall of Fame |
| 1944 | 9 | 11 | 87 | Gene Long | Boston Yanks | G | — |
| 1944 | 26 | 1 | 264 | Warren Hodges | Chicago Cardinals | T | — |
| 1944 | 30 | 3 | 310 | George Dick | Detroit Lions | E | — |
| 1945 | 27 | 5 | 276 | Don Fambrough | Chicago Cardinals | B | — |
| 1945 | 27 | 11 | 285 | Bill Chestnut | Green Bay Packers | B | — |
| 1947 | 23 | 6 | 211 | Otto Schnellbacher* | Chicago Cardinals^{NFL} | DB | Pro Bowl (1950, 1951) |
| 1947 | 29 | 5 | 270 | Bill Hogan | Green Bay Packers^{NFL} | B | — |
| 1948 | 19 | 1 | 166 | Don Ettinger | New York Giants^{NFL} | G | — |
| 1948 | 20 | 10 | 185 | Dick Monroe | Chicago Cardinals^{NFL} | C | — |
| 1949 | 22 | 8 | 219 | Dick Bertuzzi | Chicago Bears^{NFL} | B | — |
| 1949 | 23 | 7 | 228 | Frank Pattee | Washington Redskins^{NFL} | B | — |
| 1950 | 5 | 6 | 59 | Forrest Griffith | New York Giants | B | — |
| 1950 | 21 | 2 | 263 | Bud French | New York Bulldogs | B | — |
| 1950 | 21 | 7 | 268 | Dick Tomlinson | Pittsburgh Steelers | G | — |
| 1950 | 27 | 5 | 344 | Ed Lee | Washington Redskins | T | — |
| 1951 | 3 | 8 | 34 | Mike McCormack^{‡±} | New York Yanks | T | Pro Football Hall of Fame; NFL Champion (1954, 1955); Pro Bowl (1951, 1956, 1957, 1960, 1961, 1962) |
| 1951 | 5 | 2 | 52 | Wade Stinson | Green Bay Packers | B | — |
| 1951 | 29 | 3 | 342 | S. P. Garnett | San Francisco 49ers | T | — |
| 1952 | 20 | 11 | 240 | Bob Brandenberry | Cleveland Browns | B | — |
| 1952 | 25 | 8 | 297 | Bud Laughlin | San Francisco 49ers | B | — |
| 1953 | 2 | 6 | 19 | Gil Reich | Green Bay Packers | B | — |
| 1953 | 4 | 8 | 45 | George Mrkonic | Philadelphia Eagles | G | — |
| 1953 | 6 | 12 | 73 | Ollie Spencer | Detroit Lions | T | — |
| 1953 | 12 | 5 | 138 | Jerry Robertson | Pittsburgh Steelers | B | — |
| 1953 | 13 | 10 | 155 | Galen Fiss^{‡} | Cleveland Browns | B | NFL Champion (1964); Pro Bowl (1962, 1963) |
| 1953 | 22 | 1 | 254 | Merlin Gish | Baltimore Colts | C | — |
| 1953 | 26 | 10 | 311 | Charlie Hoag | Cleveland Browns | B | — |
| 1954 | 5 | 6 | 55 | Bob Hantla | San Francisco 49ers | G | — |
| 1954 | 14 | 8 | 165 | Hal Patterson | Philadelphia Eagles | B | — |
| 1954 | 18 | 10 | 215 | Morris Kay | San Francisco 49ers | E | — |
| 1954 | 26 | 11 | 312 | Joe Lundy | Cleveland Browns | G | — |
| 1955 | 21 | 8 | 249 | John Anderson | Philadelphia Eagles | E | — |
| 1956 | 13 | 2 | 147 | Ralph Moody | San Francisco 49ers | B | — |
| 1956 | 26 | 8 | 309 | Bev Butler | New York Giants | B | — |
| 1957 | 11 | 9 | 130 | Bob Kraus | Chicago Cardinals | G | — |
| 1957 | 14 | 4 | 161 | Don Feller | Cleveland Browns | B | — |
| 1957 | 16 | 6 | 187 | Ed Prelock | Baltimore Colts | T | — |
| 1957 | 20 | 9 | 238 | Tom Horner | Chicago Cardinals | T | — |
| 1957 | 22 | 6 | 259 | Chet Vanatta | Baltimore Colts | T | — |
| 1957 | 26 | 9 | 310 | Ted Rohde | Chicago Cardinals | B | — |
| 1957 | 30 | 8 | 357 | Frank Gibson | Chicago Cardinals | T | — |
| 1958 | 12 | 6 | 139 | Ron Clairborne | Los Angeles Rams | T | — |
| 1958 | 18 | 12 | 217 | Larry Carrier | Detroit Lions | B | — |
| 1959 | 14 | 7 | 163 | John Peppercorn | Pittsburgh Steelers | E | — |
| 1959 | 26 | 11 | 311 | Homer Floyd | Cleveland Browns | B | — |
| 1960 | 8 | 12 | 96 | Fred Hageman | New York Giants^{NFL} | C | — |
| 1960 | 10 | 2 | 110 | Curtis McClinton^{†‡} | Los Angeles Rams^{NFL} | RB | Super Bowl Champion (IV); AFL All-Star Game (1962, 1966, 1967) (Offensive MVP in 1962) |
| 1961 | 14 | 6 | 110 | Curtis McClinton^{†‡} | Dallas Texans^{AFL} | RB | Super Bowl Champion (IV); AFL All-Star Game (1962, 1966, 1967) (Offensive MVP in 1962) |
| 1961 | 14 | 3 | 185 | Doyle Schick | Washington Redskins^{NFL} | B | — |
| 1962 | 1 | 10 | 10 | John Hadl*^{|} | Detroit Lions^{NFL} | QB | College Football Hall of Fame; AFL All-Star Game (1964, 1965, 1968, 1969) (1969 MVP); Pro Bowl (1972, 1973) |
| 1962 | 3 | 8 | 24 | John Hadl*^{|} | San Diego Chargers^{AFL} | QB | College Football Hall of Fame; AFL All-Star Game (1964, 1965, 1968, 1969) (1969 MVP); Pro Bowl (1972, 1973) |
| 1962 | 7 | 1 | 85 | Bert Coan | Washington Redskins^{NFL} | RB | — |
| 1962 | 14 | 1 | 105 | Bert Coan | San Diego Chargers^{AFL} | RB | — |
| 1962 | 20 | 8 | 274 | Roger McFarland | San Francisco 49ers^{NFL} | RB | — |
| 1962 | 23 | 1 | 177 | Elvin Basham | Oakland Raiders^{AFL} | G | — |
| 1962 | 27 | 7 | 215 | Roger McFarland | Houston Oilers^{AFL} | RB | — |
| 1963 | 7 | 6 | 90 | Marv Clothier | Dallas Cowboys^{NFL} | G | — |
| 1965 | 1 | 4 | 4 | Gale Sayers*^{|±} | Chicago Bears^{NFL} | RB | College Football Hall of Fame; Pro Football Hall of Fame; Pro Bowl (1965, 1966, 1967, 1968, 1969); Pro Bowl MVP (1967. 1968, 1969) |
| 1965 | 1 | 5 | 5 | Gale Sayers*^{|±} | Kansas City Chiefs^{AFL} | B | College Football Hall of Fame; Pro Football Hall of Fame; Pro Bowl (1965, 1966, 1967, 1968, 1969); Pro Bowl MVP (1967. 1968, 1969) |
| 1965 | 8 | 3 | 101 | Brian Schweda | Chicago Bears^{NFL} | T | — |
| 1965 | 8 | 10 | 108 | Mike Shinn | Green Bay Packers^{NFL} | E | — |
| 1965 | 16 | 1 | 121 | Brian Schweda | Denver Broncos^{AFL} | T | — |
| 1965 | 19 | 1 | 145 | Ron Oelschlager | Denver Broncos^{AFL} | RB | — |
| 1966 | 11 | 6 | 97 | Willie Ray Smith | Kansas City Chiefs^{AFL} | DB | — |
| 1966 | 14 | 7 | 125 | Mike Johnson | Oakland Raiders^{AFL} | DB | — |
| 1966 | 15 | 7 | 134 | Steve Renko | Oakland Raiders^{AFL} | FB | — |
| 1967 | 6 | 1 | 134 | George Harvey | New Orleans Saints | G | — |
| 1967 | 17 | 25 | 444 | Jeff Elias | Green Bay Packers | TE | — |
| 1968 | 10 | 20 | 266 | Ben Olison | Dallas Cowboys | WR | — |
| 1969 | 2 | 15 | 41 | Bobby Douglass | Chicago Bears | QB | — |
| 1969 | 3 | 8 | 60 | Vernon Vanoy | New York Giants | DE | — |
| 1969 | 4 | 21 | 99 | John Zook* | Los Angeles Rams | DE | Pro Bowl (1973) |
| 1969 | 5 | 13 | 117 | Keith Christensen | New Orleans Saints | T | — |
| 1969 | 10 | 9 | 243 | Donnie Shanklin | Philadelphia Eagles | RB | — |
| 1969 | 14 | 3 | 341 | Billy Hunt | Atlanta Falcons | DB | — |
| 1969 | 16 | 19 | 409 | Junior Riggins | St. Louis Cardinals | RB | — |
| 1970 | 2 | 18 | 44 | Jim Bailey | Baltimore Colts | DT | — |
| 1970 | 6 | 11 | 141 | John Mosier | Denver Broncos | TE | — |
| 1970 | 10 | 13 | 247 | Jim Hatcher | Atlanta Falcons | DB | — |
| 1970 | 11 | 24 | 284 | Emery Hicks | Oakland Raiders | LB | — |
| 1970 | 17 | 12 | 428 | Bill Bell | Atlanta Falcons | K | — |
| 1971 | 1 | 6 | 6 | John Riggins^{‡±} | New York Jets | FB | Pro Football Hall of Fame; Super Bowl Champion (XVII); Super Bowl MVP (XVII); Pro Bowl (1975) |
| 1971 | 2 | 15 | 41 | Stephen Lawson | Cincinnati Bengals | G | — |
| 1971 | 5 | 2 | 106 | Larry Brown^{‡} | Pittsburgh Steelers | TE | Super Bowl Champion (IX, X, XIII, XIV); Pro Bowl (1982) |
| 1971 | 8 | 24 | 206 | Ron Jessie* | Dallas Cowboys | WR | Pro Bowl (1976) |
| 1972 | 5 | 16 | 120 | Bob Childs | Los Angeles Rams | G | — |
| 1972 | 7 | 2 | 158 | Steve Conley | Cincinnati Bengals | RB | — |
| 1972 | 14 | 2 | 340 | Karl Salb | Buffalo Bills | DT | — |
| 1972 | 15 | 16 | 380 | Steve Roach | Detroit Lions | LB | — |
| 1972 | 15 | 17 | 381 | Kenny Page | Los Angeles Rams | LB | — |
| 1973 | 3 | 24 | 76 | Roger Bernhardt | Pittsburgh Steelers | G | — |
| 1973 | 4 | 5 | 83 | Gery Palmer | Baltimore Colts | T | — |
| 1973 | 9 | 25 | 233 | Eddie Sheats | Washington Redskins | LB | — |
| 1973 | 15 | 15 | 379 | Vince O'Neil | Buffalo Bills | RB | — |
| 1974 | 1 | 15 | 15 | Don Goode | San Diego Chargers | LB | — |
| 1974 | 2 | 23 | 49 | Delvin Williams* | San Francisco 49ers | RB | Pro Bowl (1976, 1978) |
| 1974 | 3 | 11 | 63 | Mitch Sutton | Philadelphia Eagles | DT | — |
| 1974 | 3 | 14 | 66 | David Jaynes | Kansas City Chiefs | QB | — |
| 1974 | 16 | 19 | 409 | Delario Robinson | Oakland Raiders | WR | — |
| 1975 | 2 | 14 | 40 | Emmett Edwards | Houston Oilers | WR | — |
| 1975 | 4 | 25 | 103 | Bruce Adams | Minnesota Vikings | WR | — |
| 1975 | 5 | 25 | 129 | Robert Miller | Minnesota Vikings | RB | — |
| 1975 | 6 | 13 | 143 | Steve Towle | Miami Dolphins | LB | — |
| 1975 | 6 | 19 | 149 | Mike Lemon | New Orleans Saints | LB | — |
| 1976 | 2 | 15 | 43 | Kurt Knoff | Los Angeles Rams | DB | — |
| 1976 | 2 | 29 | 57 | Eddie Lewis | San Francisco 49ers | DB | — |
| 1976 | 3 | 11 | 71 | Dave Scott | Atlanta Falcons | G | — |
| 1976 | 6 | 10 | 166 | Steve Taylor | Kansas City Chiefs | DB | — |
| 1976 | 9 | 4 | 241 | Jeff Turner | Buffalo Bills | LB | — |
| 1977 | 1 | 9 | 9 | Mike Butler | Green Bay Packers | DE | — |
| 1977 | 2 | 3 | 31 | Nolan Cromwell* | Los Angeles Rams | DB | Pro Bowl (1980, 1981, 1982, 1983) |
| 1977 | 2 | 13 | 41 | Terry Beeson | Seattle Seahawks | LB | — |
| 1977 | 4 | 15 | 99 | Laverne Smith | Pittsburgh Steelers | RB | — |
| 1977 | 5 | 7 | 119 | Skip Sharp | Philadelphia Eagles | DB | — |
| 1977 | 7 | 10 | 177 | Chris Golub | Kansas City Chiefs | DB | — |
| 1977 | 8 | 20 | 215 | Waddell Smith | Kansas City Chiefs | WR | — |
| 1978 | 3 | 26 | 82 | Lindsey Mason | Oakland Raiders | T | — |
| 1978 | 5 | 16 | 126 | Tom Dinkel | Cincinnati Bengals | LB | — |
| 1978 | 5 | 20 | 130 | Norris Banks | Philadelphia Eagles | RB | — |
| 1978 | 11 | 10 | 288 | Billy Campfield | Philadelphia Eagles | RB | — |
| 1979 | 3 | 25 | 81 | Mike Wellman | Los Angeles Rams | C | — |
| 1980 | 2 | 3 | 31 | Kirby Criswell | Cincinnati Bengals | LB | — |
| 1980 | 3 | 14 | 70 | LeRoy Irvin* | Los Angeles Rams | DB | Pro Bowl (1985, 1986) |
| 1980 | 5 | 13 | 123 | Jim Zidd | New York Jets | LB | — |
| 1980 | 11 | 16 | 293 | Mike Hubach | New England Patriots | P | — |
| 1981 | 1 | 10 | 10 | David Verser | Cincinnati Bengals | WR | — |
| 1981 | 11 | 1 | 277 | Lester Mickens | New Orleans Saints | WR | — |
| 1982 | 7 | 17 | 184 | Greg Smith | Kansas City Chiefs | DT | — |
| 1982 | 9 | 8 | 231 | Dan Wagoner | Detroit Lions | DB | — |
| 1983 | 2 | 24 | 52 | Wayne Capers | Pittsburgh Steelers | WR | — |
| 1983 | 11 | 20 | 299 | Bucky Scribner | Green Bay Packers | P | — |
| 1984 | 5 | 12 | 124 | Paul Fairchild | New England Patriots | G | — |
| 1984 | 7 | 16 | 184 | Bruce Kallmeyer | New England Patriots | K | — |
| 1984 | 7 | 19 | 187 | Renwick Atkins | Detroit Lions | T | — |
| 1984s | 3 | 20 | 76 | Frank Seurer | Seattle Seahawks | QB | — |
| 1984s | 3 | 22 | 78 | Reggie Smith | Denver Broncos | T | — |
| 1986 | 3 | 20 | 75 | Alvin Walton^{†} | Washington Redskins | DB | Super Bowl champion (XXII) |
| 1986 | 6 | 22 | 160 | Lynn Williams | Los Angeles Rams | RB | — |
| 1986 | 7 | 8 | 174 | Mike Norseth | Cleveland Browns | QB | — |
| 1986 | 7 | 19 | 185 | Johnny Holloway | Dallas Cowboys | WR | — |
| 1987 | 11 | 10 | 289 | Paul Oswald | Pittsburgh Steelers | C | — |
| 1991 | 10 | 17 | 267 | Curtis Moore | Houston Oilers | LB | — |
| 1992 | 5 | 12 | 124 | Chris Perez | Miami Dolphins | T | — |
| 1992 | 9 | 9 | 233 | Tim Hill | Cleveland Browns | DB | — |
| 1993 | 1 | 26 | 26 | Dana Stubblefield^{‡} | San Francisco 49ers | DT | Super Bowl Champion (XXIX); Pro Bowl (1994, 1995, 1997) |
| 1993 | 3 | 23 | 79 | Gilbert Brown^{†} | Minnesota Vikings | DT | Super Bowl Champion (XXXI) |
| 1994 | 4 | 25 | 128 | Chris Maumalanga | New York Giants | DT | — |
| 1995 | 7 | 6 | 214 | Gerald McBurrows | St. Louis Rams | DB | — |
| 1995 | 7 | 20 | 228 | Hessley Hempstead | Detroit Lions | G | — |
| 1996 | 3 | 18 | 79 | Dorian Brew | Miami Dolphins | DB | — |
| 1996 | 7 | 10 | 219 | Rod Jones | Cincinnati Bengals | T | — |
| 1996 | 7 | 17 | 226 | Chris Banks^{†} | Denver Broncos | G | Super Bowl Champion (XXXIII) |
| 1996 | 7 | 26 | 235 | L. T. Levine | Denver Broncos | RB | — |
| 1997 | 3 | 33 | 93 | Ronnie Ward | Miami Dolphins | RB | — |
| 1997 | 5 | 33 | 163 | June Henley | Kansas City Chiefs | RB | — |
| 1997 | 6 | 32 | 195 | Isaac Byrd | Kansas City Chiefs | WR | — |
| 1998 | 7 | 50 | 239 | Ron Warner^{†} | New Orleans Saints | LB | Super Bowl Champion (XXXVII) |
| 2001 | 4 | 20 | 115 | Moran Norris | New Orleans Saints | FB | — |
| 2002 | 4 | 15 | 113 | Nate Dwyer | Arizona Cardinals | DT | — |
| 2002 | 6 | 15 | 187 | Justin Hartwig^{†} | Tennessee Titans | C | Super Bowl Champion (XLIII) |
| 2004 | 4 | 36 | 132 | Adrian Jones | New York Jets | T | — |
| 2005 | 5 | 3 | 139 | David McMillan | Cleveland Browns | DE | — |
| 2008 | 1 | 20 | 20 | Aqib Talib^{‡} | Tampa Bay Buccaneers | DB | Super Bowl Champion (50); Pro Bowl (2013, 2014, 2015, 2016) |
| 2008 | 4 | 13 | 112 | Anthony Collins | Cincinnati Bengals | T | — |
| 2008 | 4 | 33 | 132 | Derek Fine | Buffalo Bills | TE | — |
| 2008 | 6 | 5 | 171 | Marcus Henry | New York Jets | WR | — |
| 2010 | 4 | 12 | 110 | Darrell Stuckey* | San Diego Chargers | DB | Pro Bowl (2014) |
| 2010 | 5 | 34 | 165 | Kerry Meier | Atlanta Falcons | WR | — |
| 2010 | 6 | 22 | 191 | Dezmon Briscoe | Cincinnati Bengals | WR | — |
| 2013 | 5 | 23 | 156 | Tanner Hawkinson | Cincinnati Bengals | T | — |
| 2015 | 5 | 4 | 140 | Ben Heeney | Oakland Raiders | LB | — |
| 2015 | 6 | 15 | 191 | JaCorey Shepherd | Philadelphia Eagles | DB | — |
| 2015 | 7 | 25 | 242 | Dexter McDonald | Oakland Raiders | DB | — |
| 2018 | 4 | 16 | 116 | Dorance Armstrong | Dallas Cowboys | DE | — |
| 2020 | 6 | 1 | 180 | Hakeem Adeniji | Cincinnati Bengals | T | — |
| 2022 | 6 | 2 | 181 | Kyron Johnson | Philadelphia Eagles | LB | — |
| 2024 | 3 | 22 | 86 | Dominick Puni | San Francisco 49ers | G | — |
| 2024 | 5 | 9 | 144 | Austin Booker | Chicago Bears | DE | — |
| 2025 | 6 | 8 | 184 | Devin Neal | New Orleans Saints | RB | — |
| 2025 | 6 | 16 | 192 | Bryce Cabeldue | Seattle Seahawks | G | — |
| 2026 | 5 | 39 | 179 | Enrique Cruz Jr. | San Francisco 49ers | T | — |
| 2026 | 6 | 18 | 199 | Emmanuel Henderson | Seattle Seahawks | WR | — |

== Notable undrafted players ==
Below are players who played at least two seasons in the NFL.

Note: No drafts held before 1936

| Year | Player | Position | Debut Team | Notes |
|---|---|---|---|---|
| 1981 | Frank Wattelet | DB | New Orleans Saints | — |
| 1984 | Bobby Johnson | WR | New York Giants | Super Bowl champion (XXI) |
| 1984 | Elvis Patterson^{†} | DB | New York Giants | Super Bowl champion (XXI, XXVIII) |
| 1987 | Steve Nave | LB | Cleveland Browns | — |
| 1992 | Doug Terry | S | Kansas City Chiefs | — |
| 1995 | Kwamie Lassiter | DB | Arizona Cardinals | — |
| 1998 | Tony Blevins | DB | San Francisco 49ers | — |
| 1999 | Dan Dercher | T | San Francisco 49ers | — |
| 2006 | Charles Gordon | DB | Minnesota Vikings | — |
| 2010 | Chris Harris Jr.^{‡} | S | Denver Broncos | Super Bowl Champion (50); Pro Bowl (2014, 2015, 2016, 2018) |
| 2013 | Bradley McDougald | S | Kansas City Chiefs | — |
| 2017 | Fish Smithson | S | Washington Redskins | — |
| 2019 | Steven Sims | WR | Washington Redskins | — |

== See also ==
- List of University of Kansas people
