= 1946 Kansas Jayhawks football team =

American college football season

1946 Kansas Jayhawks football

Big 6 co-champion
- Conference: Big Six Conference
- Record: 7–2–1 (4–1 Big 6)
- Head coach: George Sauer (1st season)
- Home stadium: Memorial Stadium

1946 Big Six Conference football standings
	Conf.					Overall
Team	W		L		T	W		L		T
Kansas +	4	–	1	–	0	7	–	2	–	1
No. 14 Oklahoma +	4	–	1	–	0	8	–	3	–	0
Missouri	3	–	2	–	0	5	–	4	–	1
Nebraska	3	–	2	–	0	3	–	6	–	0
Iowa State	1	–	4	–	0	2	–	6	–	1
Kansas State	0	–	5	–	0	0	–	9	–	0
+ – Conference co-champions; Rankings from AP Poll

The 1946 Kansas Jayhawks football team was an American football team that represented the University of Kansas in the Big Six Conference during the 1946 college football season. In their first season under head coach George Sauer, the Jayhawks compiled a 7–2–1 record (4–1 against conference opponents), tied with Oklahoma for the conference championship, and outscored opponents by a combined total of 157 to 145.

Seven Kansas players received honors from the Associated Press (AP) or United Press (UP) on the 1946 All-Big Six Conference football team: halfback Ray Evans (AP-1, UP-1); end Otto Schnellbacher (AP-1, UP-1); guard Don Fambrough (AP-1, UP-1); end David Schmidt (AP-2, UP-2); back Frank Pattee (UP-3); back Bud French (UP-3); and tackle Don Ettinger (UP-3).

Kansas was ranked at No. 76 in the final Litkenhous Difference by Score System rankings for 1946.

The team played its home games at Memorial Stadium in Lawrence, Kansas.

== Schedule ==
Date	Opponent	Site	Result	Attendance	Source
September 21	vs. TCU*	Blues Stadium; Kansas City, MO	T 0–0	20,405	
September 27	at Denver*	DU Stadium; Denver, CO	W 21–13		
October 5	Wichita*	Memorial Stadium; Lawrence, KS	W 14–7		
October 12	at Iowa State	Clyde Williams Field; Ames, IA	W 24–8	12,000	
October 19	Nebraska^{†}	Memorial Stadium; Lawrence, KS (rivalry)	L 14–16	33,000	
October 26	at Tulsa*	Skelly Field; Tulsa, OK	L 0–56	13,000	
November 2	Oklahoma A&M*	Memorial Stadium; Lawrence, KS	W 14–13	20,000	
November 9	No. 16 Oklahoma	Memorial Stadium; Lawrence, KS	W 16–13	15,000	
November 16	at Kansas State	Memorial Stadium; Manhattan, KS (rivalry)	W 34–0	17,000	
November 28	at Missouri	Memorial Stadium; Columbia, MO (Border War)	W 20–19	29,000	
*Non-conference game; ^{†}Homecoming; Rankings from AP Poll released prior to the game

== After the season ==
The 1947 NFL draft was held on December 16, 1946. The following Jayhawks were selected.

Round	Pick	Player	Position	NFL club
25	231	Otto Schnellbacher	Defensive back	Chicago Cardinals
31	290	Bill Hogan	Back	Green Bay Packers
