= 1946 Missouri Tigers football team =

American college football season

1946 Missouri Tigers football
- Conference: Big Six Conference
- Record: 5–4–1 (3–2 Big 6)
- Head coach: Don Faurot (9th season)
- Home stadium: Memorial Stadium

1946 Big Six Conference football standings
	Conf.					Overall
Team	W		L		T	W		L		T
Kansas +	4	–	1	–	0	7	–	2	–	1
No. 14 Oklahoma +	4	–	1	–	0	8	–	3	–	0
Missouri	3	–	2	–	0	5	–	4	–	1
Nebraska	3	–	2	–	0	3	–	6	–	0
Iowa State	1	–	4	–	0	2	–	6	–	1
Kansas State	0	–	5	–	0	0	–	9	–	0
+ – Conference co-champions; Rankings from AP Poll

The 1946 Missouri Tigers football team was an American football team that represented the University of Missouri in the Big Six Conference (Big 6) during the 1946 college football season. The team compiled a 5–4–1 record (3–2 against Big 6 opponents), finished in a tie for third place in the Big 6, and was outscored by all opponents by a combined total of 166 to 158.

After three years of wartime service in the United States Navy, Don Faurot returned as the team's head coach in 1946. The 1946 season was Faurot's ninth of 19 seasons as head coach of the Missouri football team.

Seven Missouri players received honors from the Associated Press (AP) or United Press (UP) on the 1946 All-Big Six Conference football team: back Lloyd Brinkman (AP-1, UP-1); end Roland Oakes (AP-1, UP-1); tackle Jim Kekeris (AP-1, UP-1); back Bob Hopkins (AP-2, UP-2); center Ralph Stewart (AP-2, UP-2); end Marshall Shurnas (UP-3); and guard Verlie Abrams (UP-3).

The team's leading scorers were Howard Bonnett and Loyd Brinkman, each with 30 points.

Missouri was ranked at No. 77 in the final Litkenhous Difference by Score System rankings for 1946.

The team played its home games at Memorial Stadium in Columbia, Missouri.

== Schedule ==
Date	Opponent	Site	Result	Attendance	Source
September 21	at Texas*	Memorial Stadium; Austin, TX	L 0–42	37,000	
September 28	at Ohio State*	Ohio Stadium; Columbus, OH	T 13–13	65,004	
October 4	at Saint Louis*	Walsh Stadium; St. Louis, MO	W 19–14	17,951	
October 12	at Kansas State	Memorial Stadium; Manhattan, KS	W 26–0	12,000	
October 19	Iowa State	Memorial Stadium; Columbia, MO (rivalry)	W 33–13	16,000	
October 26	SMU*	Memorial Stadium; Columbia, MO	L 0–17	> 20,000	
November 2	at Nebraska	Memorial Stadium; Lincoln, NE (rivalry)	W 21–20	34,000	
November 9	Colorado*	Memorial Stadium; Columbia, MO	W 21–0	6,000	
November 16	at Oklahoma	Oklahoma Memorial Stadium; Norman, OK (rivalry)	L 6–27	33,431	
November 28	Kansas	Memorial Stadium; Columbia, MO (rivalry)	L 19–20	29,000	
*Non-conference game

== 1947 NFL draft ==
The 1947 NFL draft was held on December 16, 1946. The following Tigers were selected.

Round	Pick	Player	Position	NFL club
3	14	Jim Kekeris	Tackle	Detroit Lions
26	244	Ralph Stewart	Center	New York Giants
