= 1946 Iowa State Cyclones football team =

American college football season

1946 Iowa State Cyclones football
- Conference: Big Six Conference
- Record: 2–6–1 (1–4 Big 6)
- Head coach: Mike Michalske (5th season)
- Captain: None
- Home stadium: Clyde Williams Field

1946 Big Six Conference football standings
	Conf.					Overall
Team	W		L		T	W		L		T
Kansas +	4	–	1	–	0	7	–	2	–	1
No. 14 Oklahoma +	4	–	1	–	0	8	–	3	–	0
Missouri	3	–	2	–	0	5	–	4	–	1
Nebraska	3	–	2	–	0	3	–	6	–	0
Iowa State	1	–	4	–	0	2	–	6	–	1
Kansas State	0	–	5	–	0	0	–	9	–	0
+ – Conference co-champions; Rankings from AP Poll

The 1946 Iowa State Cyclones football team represented Iowa State College of Agricultural and Mechanic Arts (later renamed Iowa State University) in the Big Six Conference during the 1946 college football season. In their fifth and final year under head coach Mike Michalske, the Cyclones compiled a 2–6–1 record (1–4 against conference opponents), finished in fifth place in the conference, and were outscored by opponents by a combined total of 239 to 77. They played their home games at Clyde Williams Field in Ames, Iowa.

Two Iowa State players received honors from the Associated Press (AP) or United Press (UP) on the 1946 All-Big Six Conference football team: end Dean Laun (UP-2); and back Dick Howard (UP-3).

There was no team captain selected for the 1946 season. The regular starting lineup consisted of ends Dean Laun and Bob Jensen, tackles Lou Bosnyak and Harle Rollinger, guards Fred Schneider and Norman Anderson, center James Riding, quarterback Don Ferguson, halfbacks Webb Halbert and Vic Weber, and fullback Ray Klootwyk.

== Schedule ==
Date	Time	Opponent	Site	Result	Attendance	Source
September 21	3:30 pm	at Colorado*	Folsom Field; Boulder, CO	L 7–13	17,500	
September 28	1:00 pm	at Northwestern*	Dyche Stadium; Evanston, IL	L 9–41	41,000	
October 5	2:00 pm	Iowa State Teachers*	Clyde Williams Field; Ames, IA	W 20–18	12,000	
October 12	2:00 pm	Kansas	Clyde Williams Field; Ames, IA	L 8–24	12,000	
October 19	2:00 pm	at Missouri	Memorial Stadium; Columbia, MO (rivalry)	L 13–33	16,000	
October 26	2:00 pm	No. 14 Oklahoma^{†}	Clyde Williams Field; Ames, IA	L 0–63	15,176	
November 2	2:00 pm	at Kansas State	Ahearn Field; Manhattan, KS (rivalry)	W 13–7	10,000	
November 9	2:00 pm	Drake*	Clyde Williams Field; Ames, IA	T 7–7	9,116	
November 16	2:00 pm	at Nebraska	Memorial Stadium; Lincoln, NE (rivalry)	L 0–33	25,749	
*Non-conference game; ^{†}Homecoming; Rankings from AP Poll released prior to the game; All times are in Central time

== After the season ==
The 1947 NFL draft was held on December 16, 1946. The following Cyclone was selected.

Round	Pick	Player	Position	NFL club
12	196	LaVerne Camarata	Back	Detroit Lions
