= 1946 Nebraska Cornhuskers football team =

American college football season

1946 Nebraska Cornhuskers football
- Conference: Big Six Conference
- Record: 3–6 (3–2 Big 6)
- Head coach: Bernie Masterson (1st season)
- Offensive scheme: T formation
- Home stadium: Memorial Stadium

1946 Big Six Conference football standings
	Conf.					Overall
Team	W		L		T	W		L		T
Kansas +	4	–	1	–	0	7	–	2	–	1
No. 14 Oklahoma +	4	–	1	–	0	8	–	3	–	0
Missouri	3	–	2	–	0	5	–	4	–	1
Nebraska	3	–	2	–	0	3	–	6	–	0
Iowa State	1	–	4	–	0	2	–	6	–	1
Kansas State	0	–	5	–	0	0	–	9	–	0
+ – Conference co-champions; Rankings from AP Poll

The 1946 Nebraska Cornhuskers football team was an American football team that represented the University of Nebraska as a member of the Big Six Conference during the 1946 college football season. In their first year under head coach Bernie Masterson, the Cornhuskers compiled a 3–6 record (3–2 against Big 6 opponents) and were outscored by a total of 161 to 126.

Six Nebraska players received honors from the Associated Press (AP) or United Press (UP) on the 1946 All-Big Six Conference football team: back Thoma Novak (AP-1, UP-2); back Dick Hutton (AP-2, UP-1); back Sam Vacanti (AP-2, UP-2); tackle Carl Samuelson (AP-2, UP-2); guard Ed Schwartzkopf (AP-2, UP-3); and center Joe Partington (UP-3).

Nebraska was ranked at No. 67 in the final Litkenhous Difference by Score System rankings for 1946.

The team played its home games at Memorial Stadium in Lincoln, Nebraska.

== Before the season ==
After the unexpected departure of head coach George Clark after just one year, Nebraska athletic director and former head coach Adolph J. Lewandowski hired Bernie Masterson, considered well-learned in running the T formation offense popular at the time. Masterson retained only one of Clark's assistant coaches, yet brought back former Nebraska head football coach Glenn Presnell as an assistant with his new staff. After the remarkable turnaround of Nebraska's fortunes in 1945, the Cornhuskers looked to continue their climb up from the depths of the war years.

== Schedule ==
Date	Time	Opponent	Site	Result	Attendance	Source
September 28	2:00 p.m.	at Minnesota*	Memorial Stadium; Minneapolis, MN (rivalry)	L 6–33	51,093	
October 5	2:00 p.m.	Kansas State	Memorial Stadium; Lincoln, NE (rivalry)	W 31–0	35,553	
October 12	2:00 p.m.	at Iowa*	Iowa Stadium; Iowa City, IA (rivalry)	L 7–21	30,500	
October 19	2:00 p.m.	at Kansas	Memorial Stadium; Lawrence, KS (rivalry)	W 16–14	33,000	
October 26	2:00 p.m.	Indiana*	Memorial Stadium; Lincoln, NE	L 7–27	36,200	
November 2	2:00 p.m.	Missouri^{†}	Memorial Stadium; Lincoln, NE (rivalry)	L 20–21	34,000	
November 16	2:00 p.m.	Iowa State	Memorial Stadium; Lincoln, NE (rivalry)	W 33–0	25,749	
November 23	2:00 p.m.	at No. 18 Oklahoma	Memorial Stadium; Norman, OK (rivalry)	L 6–27	25,000	
November 30	4:00 p.m.	at No. 4 UCLA*	Los Angeles Memorial Coliseum; Los Angeles, CA	L 0–18	52,558	
*Non-conference game; ^{†}Homecoming; Rankings from AP Poll released prior to the game; All times are in Central time

== Roster ==
- #46 E Bunker, Willard
- #62 E Cochrane, Alex
- #28 FB Collopy, Frank
- #40 G Deviney, Robert
- #34 T DiBiase, Michael
- #14 QB Fischer, Cletus
- C Gade, Gail
- #39 T Hall, Gordon
- #32 E Hazen, Jack
- #71 E Hopp, Wallace
- #66 HB Hutton, Richard
- G Jacupke, Gerald
- #52 G Leik, Francis
- #27 G Lipps, Robert
- #15 HB Long, Roy
- #53 G Lorenz, Fred
- #73 E Mandula, Francis
- McWilliams, James
- #36 QB Metheny, Fred
- #42 HB Moomey, William
- #11 FB Moore, Gerald
- #70 FB Myers, James
- #68 FB Novak, Tom
- #44 E Nyden, Ed
- #20 QB Partington, Joe
- #50 E Pesek, Jack
- #18 HB Rooney, Patrick
- #55 E Samuelson, Carl
- #41 E Schleiger, Robert
- #17 G Schwartzkopf, Ed
- #24 T Sedlacek, John
- #61 T Stiner, Vernon
- #30 HB Stroud, Harvey
- #54 C Taylor, James
- #63 T Tegt, Robert
- #13 QB Thompson, Richard
- #57 C Thomson, James
- #33 QB Vacanti, Sam
- #37 G Wilkins, Frank

== Coaching staff ==
Name	Title	First year in this position	Years at Nebraska	Alma mater
Bernie Masterson	Head coach	1946	1946–1947	
Ray Prochaska	Assistant coach	1946	1946–1948, 1950–1954	Nebraska
Glenn Presnell		1946	1938–1942, 1946	Nebraska
L. F. "Pop" Klein	Assistant coach	1945	1945–1958	
Gomer Jones		1946	1946	Ohio State
B. Kahler		1946	1946	
Gerald Kathol		1946	1946	

== Game summaries ==
=== Minnesota ===
Nebraska at Minnesota

Team	1	2	Total
Nebraska			6
• Minnesota			33

- Date: September 28
- Location: Memorial Stadium • Minneapolis
- Game attendance: 51,096

It was another in a long string of disappointing losses as Nebraska once again was overmatched and outplayed by longtime nemesis Minnesota in Minneapolis. The Cornhuskers managed a single touchdown to avoid the shutout, but found that implementing coach Masterson's schemes would be a work in progress. It was the sixth win in a row in the series for the Golden Gophers, as they extended their mastery over Nebraska to 22–4–2.

=== Kansas State ===
Kansas State at Nebraska

Team	1	2	Total
Kansas State			0
• Nebraska			31

- Date: October 5
- Location: Memorial Stadium • Lincoln, Nebraska
- Game attendance: 35,553

Every player on the Nebraska roster saw playing time as the Cornhuskers easily bounced the Wildcats in the Lincoln home opener. Kansas State never found the scoreboard while also failing to prevent Nebraska from putting points up in all four quarters. It was Nebraska's fourth straight win over the Wildcats as they improved to 25–4–2 all time.

=== Iowa ===
Nebraska at Iowa

Team	1	2	3	4	Total
Nebraska	7	0	0	0	7
• Iowa	0	14	0	7	21

- Date: October 12
- Location: Iowa Stadium • Iowa City, Iowa
- Game attendance: 30,500

Iowa brought the Cornhuskers to Iowa City for Nebraska's second non-conference game of the year, and dealt a blow to the Cornhuskers with the help of repeated Nebraska miscues. Although Iowa allowed the first points of the game to be scored by Nebraska, the rest of the day belonged to the Hawkeyes. The Cornhuskers could have made it a game, but fumbles and stalled drives were too much to overcome, and their series lead slipped to 24–11–3.

=== Kansas ===
Nebraska at Kansas

Team	1	2	3	4	Total
• Nebraska	0	7	6	3	16
Kansas	0	0	7	7	14

- Date: October 19
- Location: Memorial Stadium • Lawrence, Kansas

In front of a Kansas homecoming crowd in Lawrence, the Cornhuskers played a back and forth game against the Jayhawks, but once holding the lead, kept their advantage to the end and locked in their 40th all-time decision over the disappointed home team. A late fourth-quarter touchdown allowed Kansas to narrow the final margin, but could not prevent the Cornhuskers from securing their second series win in a row and improving to 40–10–3 all time.

=== Indiana ===
Indiana at Nebraska

Team	1	2	3	4	Total
• Indiana	0	14	0	13	27
Nebraska	0	0	7	0	7

- Date: October 26
- Location: Memorial Stadium • Lincoln, Nebraska

Reigning Big 9 champion Indiana arrived in Lincoln to provide Nebraska's second major challenge of the season. By halftime the Cornhuskers had not yet scored and lagged by 14 points, but halved the gap shortly after the break. The Hoosiers were not seriously threatened by the lone Nebraska score as they subsequently rolled off another thirteen points to pull away and improve to 6–3–2 over the Cornhuskers, their sixth straight win in the series. Indiana went on to finish the season 6–3 and ranked 20th by the AP Poll,

=== Missouri ===
Missouri at Nebraska

Team	1	2	Total
• Missouri			21
Nebraska			20

- Date: November 2
- Location: Memorial Stadium • Lincoln, Nebraska
- Game attendance: 34,000

Missouri was the target for the 1946 Nebraska homecoming fray, and an impressive contest was held by both squads as they battled up and down the field. Missouri initially succeeded while the Cornhuskers struggled to create progress, but with just seconds left in the first half Missouri allowed a score that denied them the first half shutout. The conversion kick after went wide, and the one missed point would ultimately decide the game. Nebraska was driving late with under five minutes to go but finally went three and out, and the Tigers then ran the clock out to escape with the one point win. Nebraska's hold on the series overall remained strong at 24–13–3.

=== Iowa State ===
Iowa State at Nebraska

Team	1	2	3	4	Total
Iowa State	0	0	0	0	0
• Nebraska	6	13	7	7	33

- Date: November 16
- Location: Memorial Stadium • Lincoln, Nebraska
- Game attendance: 25,749

The Cyclones were dominated by an effective attack by ground and air at Memorial Stadium, and also by several of their own miscues. With points scored in all four quarters by the Cornhuskers, Iowa State simply fell before the onslaught and never overcame the momentum to avoid a shutout defeat. Nebraska's ownership of the series advanced to 31–8–1.

=== Oklahoma ===
Nebraska at #18 Oklahoma

Team	1	2	Total
Nebraska			6
• #18 Oklahoma			27

- Date: November 23
- Location: Oklahoma Memorial Stadium • Norman, Oklahoma

For the first time in five years, Nebraska had a chance at the Big 6 championship, as both squads entered their last Big 6 game with 3–1 league records. Oklahoma, however, was highly favored, and ranked #18 upon the arrival of the Cornhuskers in Norman. At first, the Cornhuskers made it a game, keeping up with the Sooners at 6–7, but Oklahoma quickly shut down all further Nebraska efforts and ran away with the game to hand Nebraska their 30th Big 6 league loss of all time. Oklahoma clinched the Big 6 title, went on to finish the season 7–3 overall, and earned a final #14 ranking from the AP Poll.

=== UCLA ===
Nebraska at #4 UCLA

Team	1	2	Total
Nebraska			0
• #4 UCLA			18

- Date: November 30
- Location: Los Angeles Memorial Coliseum • Los Angeles
- Game attendance: 52,558

This was the first time Nebraska had met UCLA on the field, and the Bruins marked the event by handing down the first shutout loss of the season to the Cornhusker squad. Nebraska made several key defensive plays to slow UCLA's offensive machine, but it was impossible to turn away all attacks and the undefeated Bruins eventually put in eighteen points on the day. UCLA finished 1946 at 10–0, ranked #4, and participated in the 1947 Rose Bowl, losing the decision 45–14 to Illinois.

== After the season ==
Coach Masterson's first season did not measure up to expectations, though some of the disappointments could be attributed to the installation of yet another new coach's schemes, as Masterson was the fifth head coach at Nebraska in just the past ten years. The brief ray of hope for a resurgence under previous coach Clark's one year in 1945 seemed dimmer, but there was still reason to hope. Masterson's first year team moved Nebraska backwards overall, to 312–133–31 (.688), but improved the league record slightly to 116–30–11 (.774).

=== NFL draft ===
The 1947 NFL Draft was held on December 16, 1946. The following Cornhusker was selected.

Round	Pick	Player	Position	NFL Club
10	83	Carl Samuelson	Defensive tackle	Los Angeles Rams
