= Homer Paine =

American football player (1923–2010)

No. 40
- Position: Offensive tackle

Personal information
- Born: September 20, 1923; Hennessey, Oklahoma, U.S.
- Died: July 5, 2010 (aged 86); Enid, Oklahoma, U.S.
- Listed height: 6 ft 0 in (1.83 m)
- Listed weight: 235 lb (107 kg)

Career information
- High school: Enid
- College: Tulsa (1942); Oklahoma (1946–1948)
- NFL draft: 1946: 14th round, 128th overall pick

Career history
- Chicago Hornets (1949)

Awards and highlights
- First-team All-Big Seven (1948); Second-team All-Big Six (1946); 1942 All-MVC; 1948 INS All-Midlands

Career AAFC statistics
- Games played: 12
- Games started: 10
- Stats at Pro Football Reference

Homer Paine (September 20, 1923 – July 5, 2010) was an American football tackle. He played college football at the University of Tulsa for one season and at the University of Oklahoma for three seasons. Paine was named to the All-Missouri Valley Conference first team while at Tulsa, and he was twice named to all-conference first teams while at Oklahoma. After college, Paine played professional football for one season with the Chicago Hornets of the All-America Football Conference (AAFC). He was selected in the 14th round of the 1946 NFL draft.

== College career ==
He was born on September 20, 1923, in Hennessey, Oklahoma. Paine attended Enid High School in Enid, Oklahoma, where he played football for the "Plainsmen". Paine initially attended college at the University of Tulsa where he played varsity football in 1942. During the regular season, the Golden Hurricane compiled a 10–0 record as the only undefeated team in the nation. Tulsa beat its five conference opponents to win the Missouri Valley Conference championship, and the Hurricane was invited to the 1943 Sugar Bowl. There, fourth-ranked Tulsa was finally defeated, 14–7, by the seventh-ranked favorites, Tennessee under head coach Robert Neyland. That season, Paine was named to the All-Missouri Valley Conference first team.

In 1946, the University of Oklahoma hired a new head football coach, Jim Tatum. His recruiting strategy focused in part on luring to Oklahoma veterans who had played for the school's rivals before the war. Instead of returning to Tulsa, Paine attended Oklahoma where he played for the Sooners from 1946 to 1948. That made Paine part of Tatum's star-studded (and only) recruiting class at Norman, which included nine All-Americans. Despite not receiving All-American honors himself, Paine was later still considered one of the "top players" at Oklahoma. One author later described Paine's ability to "tell where the play was going from the pressure of the blocks, and he would try to get the jump on it, fight right into it."

During the 1946 season, the Sooners compiled an 8–3 record and secured a share of the Big Six Conference championship. Paine was named to that season's All-Big Six Conference first team. After the season, Jim Tatum left for Maryland and was replaced by Bud Wilkinson in 1947. In March 1948, Wilkinson accused a scout from the Brooklyn Dodgers of the All-America Football Conference of attempting to sign three of his players: center John Rapacz, guard Buddy Burris, and Paine. The scout denied the charge, and insisted his visit to Oklahoma was licit. The scout said he was there at the behest of Burris who wanted to discuss his potential for a future professional career.

During the 1948 season, Paine served as the captain on the Sugar Bowl championship team. After the 1948 season, he was named to the All-Big Seven Conference first team. The International News Service also named Paine as the left tackle on its All-Midlands team, across from fellow Sooner tackle Wade Walker. In a pessimistic assessment of Oklahoma's 1949 prospects, coach Wilkinson feared the loss of Paine, among other veterans, to graduation "could easily prove disastrous." His brother, Charles W. Paine, played for Oklahoma in the 1949 season.

== Professional career ==
Paine was selected by the Philadelphia Eagles in the 14th round of the 1946 NFL draft as the 128th overall pick. He played for the Chicago Hornets in the All-America Football Conference in 1949. Paine saw action in 12 games and started in ten. After his playing career, Paine moved back to Enid, Oklahoma, and became manager of the Johnston Grain Company terminal elevator.
