= Steve Conley =

Steve Conley may refer to:

- Steve Conley (running back) (born 1949), American football running back and linebacker in the 1970s
- Steve Conley (linebacker) (born 1972), American football linebacker from 1996 to 2001
- Steve Conley, comic book writer of Astounding Space Thrills
