= 1946 Kansas State Wildcats football team =

American college football season

1946 Kansas State Wildcats football
- Conference: Big Six Conference
- Record: 0–9 (0–5 Big 6)
- Head coach: Hobbs Adams (3rd season)
- Home stadium: Memorial Stadium

1946 Big Six Conference football standings
	Conf.					Overall
Team	W		L		T	W		L		T
Kansas +	4	–	1	–	0	7	–	2	–	1
No. 14 Oklahoma +	4	–	1	–	0	8	–	3	–	0
Missouri	3	–	2	–	0	5	–	4	–	1
Nebraska	3	–	2	–	0	3	–	6	–	0
Iowa State	1	–	4	–	0	2	–	6	–	1
Kansas State	0	–	5	–	0	0	–	9	–	0
+ – Conference co-champions; Rankings from AP Poll

The 1946 Kansas State Wildcats football team was an American football team that represented Kansas State University in the Big Six Conference during the 1946 college football season. The team's head football coach was Hobbs Adams, in his first and only year of his second tenure as coach of the Wildcats. The team compiled a 0–9 record (0–5 against conference opponents), finished in last place in the Big Six, and were outscored by a total of 233 to 41. They ranked 119th out of 120 major college teams in scoring offense with an average of 4.6 points scored per game. On defense, they ranked 113th, giving up an average of 25.9 points per game.

Two Kansas State players received honors from the Associated Press (AP) or United Press (UP) on the 1946 All-Big Six Conference football team: tackle Howard Heath (UP-3); and guard Edgar McNeil (UP-3).

The Wildcats played their home games in Memorial Stadium.

== Schedule ==
Date	Opponent	Site	Result	Attendance	Source
September 28	at Hardin–Simmons*	Fair Park Stadium; Abilene, TX	L 7–21	5,000	
October 5	at Nebraska	Memorial Stadium; Lincoln, NE (rivalry)	L 0–31	35,553	
October 12	Missouri	Memorial Stadium; Manhattan, KS	L 0–26	12,000	
October 19	at No. 13 Oklahoma	Oklahoma Memorial Stadium; Norman, OK	L 7–28	> 26,000	
November 2	Iowa State	Ahearn Field; Manhattan, KS (rivalry)	L 7–13	10,000	
November 9	at San Francisco*	Kezar Stadium; San Francisco, CA	L 6–38	< 4,000	
November 16	Kansas^{†}	Memorial Stadium; Manhattan, KS (rivalry)	L 0–34	17,000	
November 23	at New Mexico*	Zimmerman Field; Albuquerque, NM	L 7–14	7,000	
November 30	at Arizona*	Varsity Stadium; Tucson, AZ	L 7–28	10,000	
*Non-conference game; ^{†}Homecoming; Rankings from AP Poll released prior to the game
