= Bernie Masterson =

American football player and coach (1911–1963)

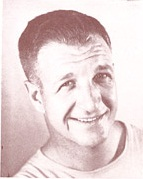
- Masterson from 1947 Cornhusker

Biographical details
- Born: August 10, 1911; Shenandoah, Iowa, U.S.
- Died: May 16, 1963 (aged 51); Chicago, Illinois, U.S.

Playing career
- 1931–1933: Nebraska
- 1934–1940: Chicago Bears
- Position: Quarterback

Coaching career (HC unless noted)
- 1940: Stanford (assistant)
- 1941: UCLA (assistant)
- 1945: St. Mary's Pre-Flight
- 1946–1947: Nebraska
- 1948: NY Yankees (assistant)
- 1950: Iowa (backfield)
- 1951: Lewis

Head coaching record
- Overall: 14–18–1
- Bowls: 1–0

Accomplishments and honors

Championships
- Midlands (1951); NFL (1940)

Awards
- Second-team All-Pro (1936); 2× Second-team All-Big Six (1932, 1933)

Bernard Edward Masterson (August 10, 1911 – May 16, 1963) was an American football player and coach. He served as the head football coach at the University of Nebraska–Lincoln from 1946 to 1947, compiling a record of 5–13. Masterson played college football at Nebraska from 1931 to 1933. He played professionally in the National Football League (NFL) with the Chicago Bears from 1934 to 1940.

== Playing career ==
Masterson was a three-sport athlete at Lincoln High. He was an all-state back in football, a starter on the 1930 state championship basketball team, and a track star.

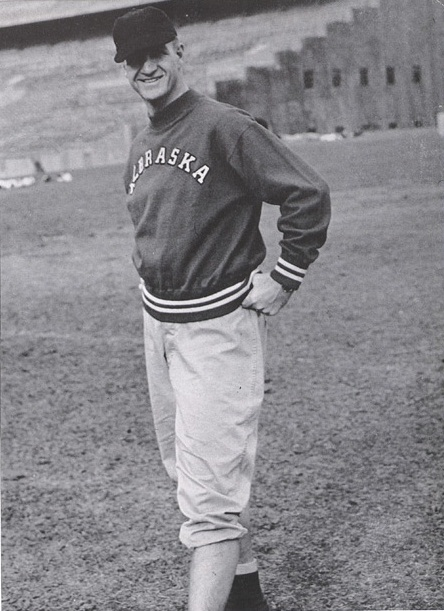
Masterson c. 1946

Moving on to the University of Nebraska–Lincoln, he starred from 1931 to 1933 as a back on three straight unbeaten Big Six championship teams. He was selected All-Big Six in 1933.

Masterson played quarterback for the Chicago Bears from 1934 to 1940 when the Bears were known as the "Monsters of the Midway". During his pro career, the Bears were 59–19–3 and were in three NFL championship playoffs. Bernie has an NFL career total of 3,372 passing yards and 35 touchdowns.

== Coaching career ==
In 1940, Clark Shaughnessy hired Masterson to coach Stanford quarterback Frankie Albert.

He joined the United States Navy in 1942, and coached Navy teams for Iowa and St. Mary's Pre-Flight until 1945.

He came back to Nebraska as head football coach for 1946 and 1947. He went 5–13 in the two seasons as head coach.

== Death and honors ==
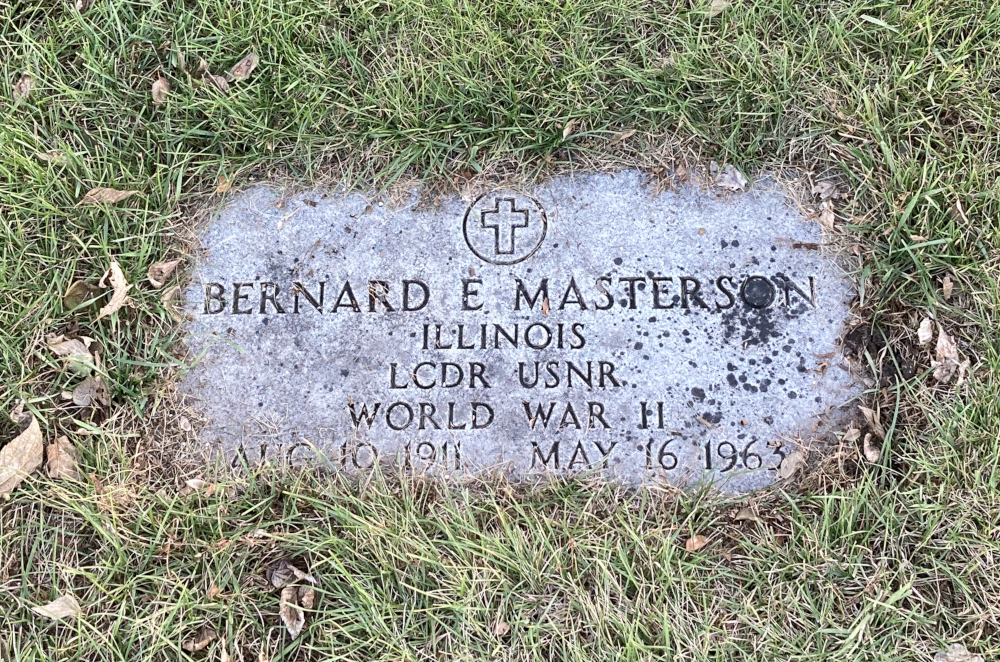
Masterson's grave at All Saints Cemetery

Masterson died of a heart attack in Chicago on May 16, 1963, and was buried at All Saints Cemetery in Des Plaines. He was inducted into the Nebraska Football Hall of Fame in 1977.

== Head coaching record ==
Year	Team	Overall	Conference	Standing	Bowl/playoffs
Saint Mary's Pre-Flight (Independent) (1945)
1945	Saint Mary's Pre-Flight	2–4–1			
Saint Mary's Pre-Flight:		2–4–1			
Nebraska Cornhuskers (Big Six Conference) (1946–1947)
1946	Nebraska	3–6	3–2	T–3rd	
1947	Nebraska	2–7	2–3	4th	
Nebraska:		5–13	5–5		
Lewis Flyers (Midlands Conference) (1951)
1951	Lewis	7–1	3–0	1st	W Corn Bowl
Lewis:		7–1	3–0		
Total:		14–18–1			
National championship Conference title Conference division title or championship game berth
