= Buddy Burris =

American football player (1923–2007)

No. 67, 33
- Positions: Guard, linebacker

Personal information
- Born: January 20, 1923; Nowata, Oklahoma, U.S.
- Died: November 26, 2007 (aged 84); Norman, Oklahoma, U.S.
- Listed height: 5 ft 11 in (1.80 m)
- Listed weight: 215 lb (98 kg)

Career information
- High school: Central (Muskogee, Oklahoma)
- College: Tulsa, Oklahoma
- NFL draft: 1947: 5th round, 31st overall pick

Career history
- Green Bay Packers (1949–1951)

Awards and highlights
- Consensus All-American (1948); 2× First-team All-Big Seven (1947, 1948); Second-team All-Big Six (1946)

Career NFL statistics
- Games played: 29
- Games started: 16
- Fumble recoveries: 2
- Military career
- Branch: United States Army
- Rank: Staff sergeant
- Stats at Pro Football Reference

Paul "Buddy" Burris (January 20, 1923 – November 26, 2007) was an American professional football player. He played college football for the Golden Hurricane at University of Tulsa, and after a hiatus to serve in the Second World War, for the Sooners at the University of Oklahoma. Burris was the first Oklahoma player to earn All-America honors in three years. After college, he played professionally in the National Football League (NFL) for three years with the Green Bay Packers.

== Early life ==
Burris was born on January 20, 1923, in Nowata, Oklahoma. He was raised in Muskogee, Oklahoma by farmer Paul "Pop" Burris. He had five sisters and five brothers. All of his male siblings also played football, with the first three earning letters at Oklahoma: Kurt, Bob, Lynn, Lyle, and Don. Buddy Burris attended Muskogee Central High School where he played football. There in 1939, he participated in the football team's 12–0 "Indian Bowl" victory over Daniel Webster High School of Tulsa, Oklahoma.

== College and military service ==
In 1942, Burris enrolled at the University of Tulsa. There, he played football for the Golden Hurricane under the head coach Henry Frnka. Burris played in the 1943 Sugar Bowl loss to sixth-ranked Tennessee. In 1943, Burris enlisted in the United States Army and served in the Second World War in Europe and Japan. While in the service, he achieved the rank of staff sergeant.

After the war, Burris returned home with the intent of resuming college. At Tulsa, head coach Frnka had moved onto Tulane and had been replaced by Buddy Brothers. Burris said he liked Brothers, but was angered by one of his assistants who told him he had an obligation to return to Tulsa. Instead, Burris went to Norman, Oklahoma to watch the Oklahoma Sooners practice. First-year head coach Jim Tatum sent Burris onto the practice field where he blocked three punts. Tatum was impressed enough to offer Burris a scholarship the following week.

From 1946 to 1948, Burris played offensive and defensive guard. He was one of many returning war veterans to join the team and among eight future All-Americans in the 1946 recruiting class. Burris became the first Sooner to be named an All-American all three years at Oklahoma. In 1948, he was named a consensus All-American. He was also the first Sooner inducted into the Helms Athletic Foundation Football Hall of Fame. Burris graduated from the University of Oklahoma with a bachelor's degree in business administration.

In March 1948, Oklahoma head coach Bud Wilkinson accused a scout from the Brooklyn Dodgers of the All-America Football Conference of attempting to sign three of his players: Burris, center John Rapacz, and tackle Homer Paine. The scout denied the charge, and insisted his visit to Oklahoma was licit and at the behest of Burris who wanted to discuss his potential for a future professional career.

== Professional career ==
Burris was selected in the fifth round of the 1947 NFL draft by the Green Bay Packers (31st overall). He played with the Packers for three seasons. In 1949, he saw action in ten games and recorded one interception and recovered one opponent fumble. In 1950, he played in nine games and returned three kickoffs for 18 yards. In 1951, he saw action in seven games and recovered one own team fumble.

After his football career, Burris worked for Dow Chemical Company. He later took a job as a contracting administrator at Tinker Air Force Base in Oklahoma City, Oklahoma. He worked for the federal government until his retirement, and he also owned and ran his own landscaping and tree surgery business, Burris Services. Burris died of natural causes on November 26, 2007, in Norman, Oklahoma.
