= Cletus Fischer =

American football player and coach (1925–2000)

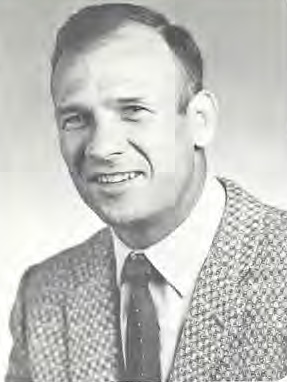
- Fischer c. 1971

No. 37
- Position: Halfback

Personal information
- Born: June 11, 1925; St. Edward, Nebraska, U.S.
- Died: December 3, 2000 (aged 75); Lincoln, Nebraska, U.S.
- Listed height: 5 ft 9 in (1.75 m)
- Listed weight: 170 lb (77 kg)

Career information
- High school: St. Edward
- College: Nebraska (1945–1948)
- NFL draft: 1949: 23rd round, 226th overall pick

Career history

Playing
- New York Giants (1949)

Coaching
- Nebraska (1960–1985) Offensive line coach

Awards and highlights
- Second-team All-Big Seven (1948)

Career NFL statistics
- Rushing yards: 72
- Rushing average: 2.8
- Receptions: 3
- Receiving yards: 45
- Total touchdowns: 1
- Stats at Pro Football Reference

Cletus Paul Fischer (June 11, 1925 – December 3, 2000) was an American professional football halfback. He played for the New York Giants in 1949.
