= Gene Pepper =

American football player (1927–2006)

No. 61, 60
- Positions: Offensive lineman, defensive tackle, linebacker

Personal information
- Born: September 22, 1927; Overland, Missouri, U.S.
- Died: January 16, 2006 (aged 78); St. Louis, Missouri, U.S.
- Listed height: 6 ft 2 in (1.88 m)
- Listed weight: 239 lb (108 kg)

Career information
- College: Missouri
- NFL draft: 1950: 6th round, 71st overall pick

Career history
- Washington Redskins (1950–1953); Baltimore Colts (1954)

Awards and highlights
- 2× Second-team All-Big Seven (1948, 1949)

Career NFL statistics
- Games played: 44
- Games started: 22
- Fumble recoveries: 2
- Stats at Pro Football Reference

Eugene Francis Pepper (September 22, 1927 – January 16, 2006) was an American professional football offensive and defensive lineman in the National Football League (NFL) for the Washington Redskins and the Baltimore Colts. He played college football at the University of Missouri and was drafted 71st overall in the sixth round of the 1950 NFL draft.
