= 1948 All-Big Seven Conference football team =

The 1948 All-Big Seven Conference football team consists of American football players chosen by various organizations for All-Big Six Conference teams for the 1948 college football season. The selectors for the 1948 season included the Associated Press (AP) and the United Press.

== All-Big Seven selections ==
=== Backs ===
- Jack Mitchell, Oklahoma (AP-1; UP-1)
- Harold Entsminger, Missouri (AP-1; UP-1)
- George Thomas, Oklahoma (AP-1; UP-1)
- Richard Gilman, Kansas (AP-1)
- Forrest Griffith, Kansas (AP-2; UP-1)
- Darrell Royal, Oklahoma (AP-2)
- Cletus Fischer, Nebraska (AP-2)
- Harry Narcisian, Colorado (AP-2)

=== Ends ===
- Mel Sheehan, Missouri (AP-1; UP-1)
- Jim Owens, Oklahoma (AP-1; UP-1)
- Dean Laun, Iowa State (AP-2)
- Ed Pudlik, Colorado (AP-2)

=== Tackles ===
- Homer Paine, Oklahoma (AP-1; UP-1)
- Chester Fritz, Missouri (AP-1; UP-1)
- Wade Walker, Oklahoma (AP-2)
- Hugh Johnson, Kansas (AP-2)

=== Guards ===
- Paul Burris, Oklahoma (AP-1; UP-1)
- Dick Tomlinson, Kansas (AP-1; UP-1)
- Joe Brubaker, Iowa State (AP-2)
- Gene Pepper, Missouri (AP-2)

=== Centers ===
- Robert Fuchs, Missouri (AP-1; UP-1)
- Richard Monroe, Kansas (AP-2)

== Key ==
AP = Associated Press

UP = United Press

== See also ==
- 1948 College Football All-America Team
