= 1947 All-Big Six Conference football team =

The 1947 All-Big Six Conference football team consists of American football players chosen by various organizations for All-Big Six Conference teams for the 1947 college football season. The selectors for the 1947 season included the United Press (UP).

== All-Big Six selections ==
=== Backs ===
- Bas Ensminger, Missouri (UP-1)
- Ray Evans, Kansas (UP-1)
- Jack Mitchell, Oklahoma (UP-1)
- Forrest Griffith, Kansas (UP-1)
- Ron Norman, Iowa St. (UP-2)
- Webb Halbert, Iowa St. (UP-2)
- George Brewer, Oklahoma (UP-2)
- Ed Quirk, Missouri (UP-2)

=== Ends ===
- Otto Schnellbacher, Kansas (UP-1)
- Mel Sheehan, Missouri (UP-1)
- Jim Tyree, Oklahoma (UP-2)
- Jack Pesek, Nebraska (UP-2)

=== Tackles ===
- Wade Walker, Oklahoma (UP-1)
- Chester Fritz, Missouri (UP-1)
- Hugh Johnson, Kansas (UP-2)
- Carl Samuelson, Nebraska (UP-2)

=== Guards ===
- Don Fambrough, Kansas (UP-1)
- Paul Burris, Oklahoma (UP-1)
- Norman Anderson, Iowa St. (UP-2)
- Dave Schirmer, Kansas St. (UP-2)

=== Centers ===
- John Rapacz, Oklahoma (UP-1)
- Tom Novak, Nebraska (UP-2)

== Key ==
UP = United Press

== See also ==
- 1947 College Football All-America Team
