= Forrest Griffith =

American football player (1928–2007)

No. 41
- Position: Halfback

Personal information
- Born: February 15, 1928; Lee's Summit, Missouri, U.S.
- Died: December 12, 2007 (aged 79); Hemet, California, U.S.
- Listed height: 5 ft 11 in (1.80 m)
- Listed weight: 190 lb (86 kg)

Career information
- High school: Lee's Summit
- College: Kansas (1946–1949)
- NFL draft: 1950: 5th round, 59th overall pick

Career history
- New York Giants (1950–1951)

Awards and highlights
- 2× First-team All-Big Seven (1947, 1948)

Career NFL statistics
- Rushing yards: 277
- Rushing average: 2.8
- Receptions: 3
- Receiving yards: 45
- Total touchdowns: 2
- Stats at Pro Football Reference

Forrest Martin Griffith (February 15, 1928 – December 12, 2007) was an American professional football halfback who played two seasons with the New York Giants of the National Football League (NFL). He was selected by the Giants in the fifth round of the 1950 NFL draft after playing college football at the University of Kansas.

== Early life and college ==
Forrest Martin Griffith was born on February 15, 1928, in Lee's Summit, Missouri. He attended Lee's Summit High School in Lee's Summit, Missouri.

Griffith was a four-year letterman for the Kansas Jayhawks of the University of Kansas from 1946 to 1949. He was named first-team All-Big Six Conference by United Press International in 1947. He earned Associated Press second-team All-Big Seven Conference and UPI first-team All-Big Seven honors in 1948.

== Professional career ==
Griffith was selected by the New York Giants in the fifth round, with the 59th overall pick, of the 1950 NFL draft. He signed with the team on June 12. He began the 1950 season sick with pneumonia. He then played in six games, starting two, for the Giants in 1950, rushing 45 times for 162 yards and two touchdowns while also catching one pass for 26 yards. On November 5 against the Washington Redskins, Griffith suffered a minor skull fracture that caused him to miss the rest of the season. He appeared in ten games, starting seven, in 1951, recording 54 carries for 115 yards and two receptions for 19 yards.

== Personal life ==
Griffith died on December 12, 2007, in Hemet, California.
