= Ralph Stewart (American football) =

American football player and coach (1925–2016)

No. 22, 20, 23
- Positions: Center, linebacker

Personal information
- Born: December 10, 1925; St. Louis, Missouri, U.S.
- Died: July 30, 2016 (aged 90); Prairie Village, Kansas, U.S.
- Listed height: 6 ft 0 in (1.83 m)
- Listed weight: 205 lb (93 kg)

Career information
- High school: McKinley (St. Louis)
- College: Missouri (1943, 1945-1946); Notre Dame (1944)
- NFL draft: 1947: 26th round, 244th overall pick

Career history

Playing
- New York Yankees (1947–1948); Baltimore Colts (1948)

Coaching
- Iowa Wesleyan (1949–1950) Line coach; Drake (1951–1955) Line coach; South Dakota (1956–1961) Head coach

Operations
- South Dakota (1957–1961) Athletic director

Awards and highlights
- First-team All-Big Six (1945); 2× Second-team All-Big Six (1943, 1946)

Career AAFC statistics
- Games played: 24
- Games started: 1
- Stats at Pro Football Reference

Ralph Edward Stewart (December 10, 1925 – July 30, 2016) was an American football player and coach. He was a star player (center and linebacker) at the University of Missouri, and played at center for the 1940s New York Yankees and Baltimore Colts football teams. After working as a line coach at Drake University, he was named athletic director and head coach of the University of South Dakota football program in 1956. Stewart later returned to the University of Missouri as director of intramural athletics. He earned three degrees from the University of Missouri (B.S., M.Ed., Ed.D.) and served 20 years as chairman of its Physical Education Department before his retirement in 1991. Stewart died on July 30, 2016.

== Head coaching record ==
Year	Team	Overall	Conference	Standing	Bowl/playoffs
South Dakota Coyotes (North Central Conference) (1956–1961)
1956	South Dakota	4–4	4–2	T–2nd	
1957	South Dakota	4–4–1	3–2–1	4th	
1958	South Dakota	5–4	4–2	2nd	
1959	South Dakota	4–5–1	3–2–1	T–2nd	
1960	South Dakota	1–8	0–6	7th	
1961	South Dakota	1–8	0–6	7th	
South Dakota:		19–33–2	14–20–2		
Total:		19–33–2			
