= Carl Samuelson (American football) =

American football player (1923–1995)

- Carl Samuelson, 1946

Profile
- Positions: Defensive tackle, tackle, end

Personal information
- Born: April 11, 1923; Grand Island, Nebraska, U.S.
- Died: August 17, 1995 (aged 68); Lincoln, Nebraska, U.S.
- Listed height: 6 ft 4 in (1.93 m)
- Listed weight: 250 lb (113 kg)

Career information
- High school: Grand Island (NE)
- College: Nebraska
- NFL draft: 1947: 10th round, 93rd overall pick

Career history
- Pittsburgh Steelers (1948-1951)

Awards and highlights
- 2× Second-team All-Big Six (1946, 1947)

Career NFL statistics
- Games: 43
- Stats at Pro Football Reference

Carl Clinton Samuelson (April 11, 1923 – August 17, 1995) was an American professional football player who played at the defensive tackle and tackle positions. He played college football at Nebraska in 1946 and 1947 and professional football for the Pittsburgh Steelers from 1947 to 1951.

== Early life ==
Samuelson was born in 1923 in Grand Island, Nebraska, and attended Grand Island High School. He served in the U.S. Navy during World War II. After the war, he played college football for the Nebraska Cornhuskers at tackle in 1946 and at end and tackle in 1947. He was inducted in 1992 into the Nebraska Football Hall of Fame.

== Pittsburgh Steelers ==
Samuelson was selected by the Pittsburgh Steelers in the 10th round (83rd overall pick) of the 1947 NFL draft. In March 1948, he announced he would leave school early to play professional football. He played for the Steelers from 1948 to 1951 and appeared in a total of 43 NFL games, 12 as a starter. He scored his only NFL touchdown against the New York Giants in October 1949 when he ripped the ball from the arms of running back Joe Scott and ran 24 yards to score. In June 1952, the Steelers traded Samuelson to the New York Giants in exchange for Al Patterson. He did not appear in any regular-season games with the Giants.

== Later life ==
After his playing career ended, Samuelson was an employee of Storz Brewing for approximately 20 years. In the 1970s, he also owned Sam's Pub in downtown Lincoln, Nebraska. He died in 1995 at age 72 in Grand Island, Nebraska.
