= Plato Andros =

American football player (1921–2008)

No. 68
- Position: Guard

Personal information
- Born: November 28, 1921; Oklahoma City, Oklahoma, U.S.
- Died: September 22, 2008 (aged 86); Norman, Oklahoma, U.S.
- Listed height: 6 ft 0 in (1.83 m)
- Listed weight: 240 lb (109 kg)

Career information
- High school: Central (Oklahoma City)
- College: Oklahoma

Career history
- Chicago Cardinals (1947–1950)

Awards and highlights
- NFL champion (1947); Second-team All-American (1946); First-team All-Big Six (1946)
- Stats at Pro Football Reference

Plato Gus Andrecopoulos (November 28, 1921 – September 22, 2008) an American professional football player who was a guard for four seasons with the Chicago Cardinals of the National Football League (NFL). He played college football for the Oklahoma Sooners, earning second-team All-American honors. Andros spent four years in the United States Coast Guard fighting German submarines before coming back to earn All-American honors as a Sooner in 1946. He played in the NFL for the Chicago from 1947 to 1950.

Plato's brother, Dee Andros, was also a star lineman at Oklahoma and later served as the head football coach and athletic director at Oregon State University. In addition to football, Andros was a member of the Oklahoma track team.
