= Don Fambrough =

American football player and coach (1922–2011)

Biographical details
- Born: October 19, 1922; Longview, Texas, U.S.
- Died: September 3, 2011 (aged 88); Lawrence, Kansas, U.S.

Playing career
- 1941–1942: Texas
- 1946–1947: Kansas
- Position: Guard

Coaching career (HC unless noted)
- 1948–1953: Kansas (assistant)
- 1954–1956: East Texas State (assistant)
- 1957: Wichita State (assistant)
- 1958–1970: Kansas (assistant)
- 1971–1974: Kansas
- 1979–1982: Kansas

Head coaching record
- Overall: 36–49–5
- Bowls: 0–2

Accomplishments and honors

Awards
- 2× first-team All-Big Six (1946, 1947); Big Eight Coach of the Year (1981)

Donald Preston Fambrough (October 19, 1922 – September 3, 2011) was an American college football player and coach. He served two stints as the head football coach at the University of Kansas, from 1971 to 1974 and 1979 to 1982, compiling a record of 36–49–5.

== Early life ==
Fambrough was born on October 19, 1922, in Longview, Texas, to Ivey and Willie Whittington Fambrough. He attended Longview High School.

== College football and military career ==
Fambrough played college football at Texas in 1941 and 1942 before serving in the United States Army Air Corps during World War II. After returning home from the war, he and his wife moved to Lawrence, Kansas. While in Lawrence, he chose to play football at the University of Kansas. Following his college career, he was drafted by the Chicago Cardinals (now known as the Arizona Cardinals) with the 276th overall selection in the 1945 NFL draft.

== Coaching career ==
Fambrough's first coaching job was at Kansas as assistant from 1948 to 1953. After that, he served as an assistant at East Texas State University, now known as Texas A&M University–Commerce and the Municipal University of Wichita, now known as Wichita State University. Fambrough returned to Kansas as assistant coach under Jack Mitchell in 1958. He served as the head football coach at Kansas from 1971 to 1974 and again from 1979 to 1982 and compiled a 36–49–5 record as a head coach.

== Later life ==
Fambrough remained involved in Kansas football leading up to his death, and would occasionally take part in team practices. The school dedicated a bench overlooking Memorial Stadium to him in 2007. Fambrough is known for his hatred of rival Missouri and gave an annual anti-Missouri speech to the football team before each Border War game.

== Personal life ==
Fambrough married his wife, Delfred Few, on October 4, 1941. Del, who taught English for many years at Lawrence High School, preceded him in death on November 17, 2001. The couple had two children, sons Robert and Preston.

== Death ==
Fambrough died September 3, 2011, at his home in Lawrence, Kansas from head injuries sustained in a fall. He was survived by two children, four grandchildren, and one great-grandchild.

== Head coaching record ==
Year	Team	Overall	Conference	Standing	Bowl/playoffs	Coaches^{#}	AP^{°}
Kansas Jayhawks (Big Eight Conference) (1971–1974)
1971	Kansas	4–7	2–5	T–5th			
1972	Kansas	4–7	2–5	T–6th			
1973	Kansas	7–4–1	4–2–1	T–2nd	L Liberty	15	18
1974	Kansas	4–7	1–6	T–7th			
Kansas Jayhawks (Big Eight Conference) (1979–1982)
1979	Kansas	3–8	2–5	T–5th			
1980	Kansas	4–5–2	3–3–1	4th			
1981	Kansas	8–4	4–3	T–3rd	L Hall of Fame Classic		
1982	Kansas	2–7–2	1–5–1	T–6th			
Kansas:		36–49–5	19–34–3				
Total:		36–49–5					
^{#}Rankings from final Coaches Poll.; ^{°}Rankings from final AP Poll.

== See also ==
- List of college football head coaches with non-consecutive tenure
