= Joe Golding =

American football player (1921–1971)

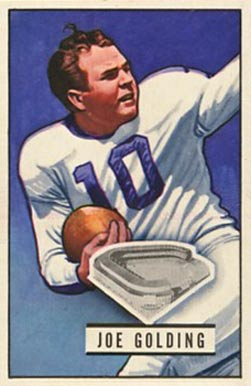

No. 10
- Positions: Halfback, defensive back

Personal information
- Born: February 26, 1921; Eufaula, Oklahoma, U.S.
- Died: December 26, 1971 (aged 50); Muskogee, Oklahoma, U.S.
- Listed height: 6 ft 0 in (1.83 m)
- Listed weight: 184 lb (83 kg)

Career information
- High school: Eufaula
- College: Oklahoma (1940-1941, 1946)
- NFL draft: 1946: 5th round, 31st overall pick

Career history
- Boston Yanks (1947–1948); New York Bulldogs / Yanks (1949–1951)

Awards and highlights
- First-team All-Big Six (1946)

Career NFL statistics
- Rushing yards: 349
- Rushing average: 3.1
- Receptions: 27
- Receiving yards: 289
- Total touchdowns: 14
- Interceptions: 19
- Fumble recoveries: 12
- Stats at Pro Football Reference

Joseph Griffith Golding (March 26, 1921 – December 26, 1971) was a professional American football halfback/defensive back in the National Football League (NFL). He played for the Boston Yanks (1947–1948) and the New York Bulldogs/Yanks (1949–1951).

His 1951 Bowman football card #115 relates the following: "In the service for 44 months. Won Silver Star, Bronze Star, Purple Heart. Commissioned on the battlefield while an infantry-man in Europe".

Golding's brother, also named Joe Golding, was a longtime high school football coach who led Wichita Falls High to four state championships. The field at Wichita Falls' Memorial Stadium was named in his honor and he was posthumously elected to the Texas High School Football Hall of Fame in 1988. His grand-nephew is current UTEP basketball coach Joe Golding.
