= Wade Walker =

American football player, coach, and administrator (1923–2013)

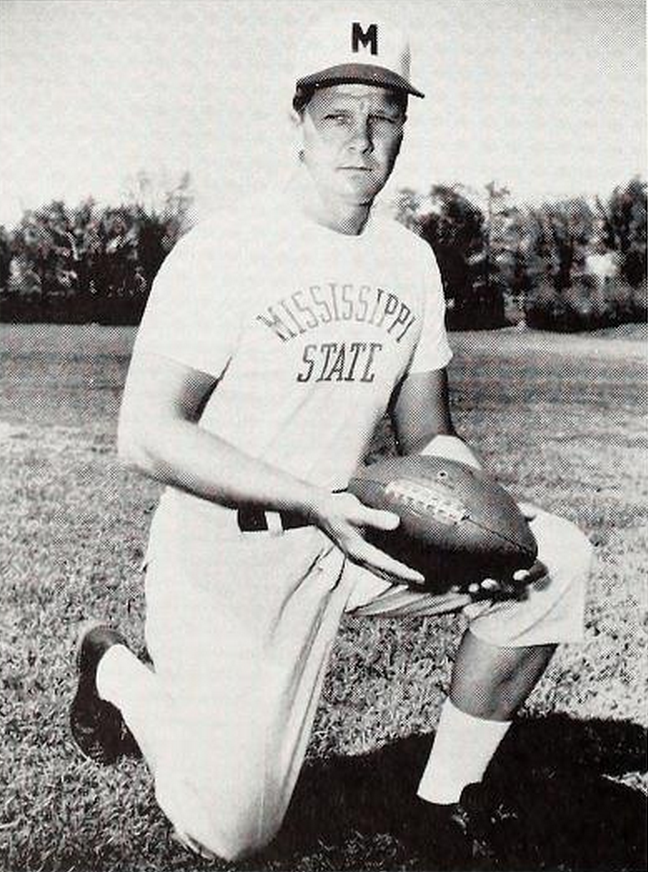
- Walker pictured in Reveille 1956, Mississippi State yearbook

Biographical details
- Born: November 29, 1923; Mocksville, North Carolina, U.S.
- Died: December 18, 2013 (aged 90); California, U.S.

Playing career
- 1946–1949: Oklahoma
- Position: Tackle

Coaching career (HC unless noted)
- 1950: NC State (assistant)
- 1951–1953: Texas Tech (assistant)
- 1954–1955: Mississippi State (line)
- 1956–1961: Mississippi State

Administrative career (AD unless noted)
- 1959–1966: Mississippi State
- 1971–1986: Oklahoma

Head coaching record
- Overall: 22–32–2

Accomplishments and honors

Awards
- First-team All-American (1949); 3× First-team All-Big Seven (1946, 1947, 1949); Second-team All-Big Seven (1948)

Wade Hampton Walker (November 29, 1923 – December 18, 2013) was an American college football player, coach, and athletics administrator. He played football as a tackle at the University of Oklahoma under head coaches Jim Tatum and Bud Wilkinson. Walker was named an all-conference player all four years and a first-team All-American in 1949. He served as the head football coach at Mississippi State for six seasons, from 1956 to 1961, and compiled a 22–32–2 record. He also served as the athletic director at Mississippi State and Oklahoma.

== College career ==
Walker was born in Mocksville, North Carolina, and attended college at the University of Oklahoma. He played for the Oklahoma Sooners football team as a tackle from 1946 to 1949, and he served as the team captain for two seasons. Walker was part of the 1946 recruiting class—brought to Norman by one-year head coach Jim Tatum—that included nine future All-Americans. In 1947, Tatum's former assistant Bud Wilkinson had taken over as head coach but by midseason the team was struggling with a 2–2 record. In an effort to evoke player leadership, he told the team to elect two co-captains to serve the remainder of the season, and they chose Walker and the previous season's honor captain, Jim Tyree. In 1948, the International News Service named Walker as the right tackle on its All-Midlands team.

In 1949, Walker was named a first-team All-American by the Associated Press, American Football Coaches Association (as a guard), Football Writers Association of America, and Newspaper Enterprise Association. He is one of just three Sooners to have been named an all-conference player each of his four years. In 47 Straight: The Wilkinson Era at Oklahoma, author Harold Keith describes Walker as a "finesse player" who eschewed hip pads and wore low-top backfield shoes to reduce the weight of his equipment. Teammate and fellow All-American Stan West said of Walker:

"I had the reputation of being the laziest man of all in our calisthenics drills, but I was chain lightning compared to him. 'Lord,' Wade used to say, 'you get warm enough out here anyhow.'"

In the 1947 NFL draft, Walker was selected in the 22nd round as the 201st overall pick by the Chicago Cardinals.

== Coaching and administrative career ==
In 1950, Walker worked as an assistant football coach at NC State. The following year, Walker served as an assistant football coach with the Texas Tech Red Raiders from 1951 to 1953 prior to his arrival at Mississippi State. Walker was an assistant coach with the Bulldogs from 1954 to 1955 before serving as Mississippi State's head football coach and athletic director from 1956 to 1961. Walker compiled a 22–32–2 record over his 6-season tenure. The Mississippi State Maroons (now known as the Bulldogs) posted a lackluster 2–7–1 record in 1959. The following year, Walker's team improved to 5–5, but students and alumni demanded his ouster. University president Dean W. Colvard relented and fired Walker as football coach, but kept him on as athletic director.

In 1963, the Mississippi State basketball team won the Southeastern Conference (SEC) championship and advanced to the second round of the NCAA tournament. They were set to face Loyola of Chicago, an integrated school, but Mississippi state schools had an unwritten prohibition against playing teams with black players. In violation of a court injunction that prohibited the team from leaving the state, Colvard ordered the athletic department staff, including Walker and head basketball coach Babe McCarthy, across state lines to Nashville, Tennessee. An assistant coach smuggled the team out of the state from a private airfield, and they met Walker and the rest of the staff before flying to Michigan to play Loyola. Mississippi State lost, 61–51, but returned home without further incident. Walker said, "There I was, acting like a fugitive and running from the law because I was doing something I believed was right."

Mississippi State football fared poorly again in 1966, and Walker and his replacement as head football coach, Paul E. Davis, both resigned. Walker returned to Oklahoma in 1971 to become the school's athletic director, and he served in that position until 1986.

== Later life and death ==
In 1987, Walker moved to La Quinta, California and worked for the Landmark Land Company. Walker died at his home in California on December 18, 2013.

== Head coaching record ==
Year	Team	Overall	Conference	Standing	AP^{#}
Mississippi State Maroons/Bulldogs (Southeastern Conference) (1956–1961)
1956	Mississippi State	4–6	2–5	T–8th	
1957	Mississippi State	6–2–1	4–2–1	T–3rd	14
1958	Mississippi State	3–6	2–5	9th	
1959	Mississippi State	2–7	0–7	12th	
1960	Mississippi State	2–6–1	0–5–1	11th	
1961	Mississippi State	5–5	1–5	T–10th	
Mississippi State:		22–32–2	8–30–2		
Total:		22–32–2			
^{#}Rankings from final Coaches Poll.; ^{°}Rankings from final AP Poll.
