= George Thomas (halfback) =

American football player (1928–1989)

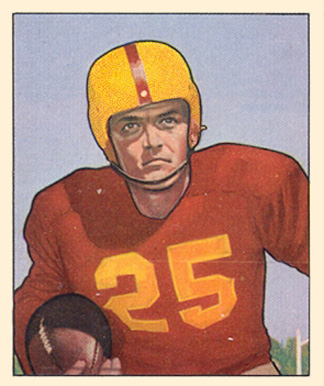
- Thomas on a 1950 Bowman football card

No. 20
- Positions: Halfback, defensive back

Personal information
- Born: March 4, 1928; Fairland, Oklahoma, U.S.
- Died: May 23, 1989 (aged 61); Scottsdale, Arizona, U.S.
- Listed height: 6 ft 1 in (1.85 m)
- Listed weight: 183 lb (83 kg)

Career information
- High school: Fairland
- College: Oklahoma
- NFL draft: 1950: 1st round, 6th overall pick

Career history
- Washington Redskins (1950–1951); New York Giants (1952)

Awards and highlights
- First-team All-American (1949); 2× First-team All-Big Seven (1948, 1949)

Career NFL statistics
- Rushing yards: 189
- Receiving yards: 208
- Touchdowns: 2
- Stats at Pro Football Reference

George Carroll "Spike" Thomas Jr. (March 4, 1928 – May 23, 1989) was an American professional football halfback and defensive back in the National Football League (NFL) for the Washington Redskins and the New York Giants.

== College career ==
Thomas was a standout high school basketball player, which led to his being recruited to play college basketball for Tulane University. However, first year OU football coach, Jim Tatum, convinced him to stay in Oklahoma and play college football at the University of Oklahoma.

Thomas was a standout for the Sooners, lettering in '46, '47, '48 and '49. He earned All-American status in 1949. Thomas graduated from OU with a degree in Business Administration in 1950.

== NFL career ==
=== Washington Redskins ===
Thomas was drafted sixth overall in the 1950 NFL draft by the Washington Redskins. He played two seasons with the Redskins in 1950 and 1951, compiling a total of 371 yards (200 receiving and 171 rushing) and two touchdowns over 24 games, three of which were starts.

=== New York Giants ===
In 1952, Thomas played with the New York Giants in seven games with five starts.

== See also ==
- List of NCAA major college football yearly scoring leaders
- List of Oklahoma Sooners football All-Americans
