= Dean Laun =

American football player and coach (1925–2011)

Biographical details
- Born: July 22, 1925; Charles City, Iowa, U.S.
- Died: October 21, 2011 (aged 86); Modesto, California, U.S.

Playing career
- 1946–1949: Iowa State
- Position: End

Coaching career (HC unless noted)
- 1950–1952: Spirit Lake HS (IA)
- 1954: York Community HS (IL) (freshmen/sophomores)
- 1955–1959: Buena Vista

Head coaching record
- Overall: 24–18–2 (college)

Accomplishments and honors

Awards
- 2× Second-team All-Big Seven (1946, 1948)

Dean Charles Laun (July 22, 1925 – October 21, 2011) was an American football coach. He served as the head football coach at Buena Vista University in Storm Lake, Iowa from 1956 to 1959, compiling a record of 24–18–2.

Laun played college football for four years at Iowa State University where he was an All-Big Seven Conference selection at end in 1947.

Laun later coached high school football at several high schools in the state of California, including Downey High School, Grace M. Davis High School and Fred C. Beyer High School.

== Head coaching record ==
=== College ===
Year	Team	Overall	Conference	Standing	Bowl/playoffs
Buena Vista Beavers (Iowa Conference) (1955–1959)
1955	Buena Vista	5–3–1	3–2–1	4th	
1956	Buena Vista	3–5–1	3–5	T–6th	
1957	Buena Vista	3–5	3–4	6th	
1958	Buena Vista	5–4	4–4	T–4th	
1959	Buena Vista	8–1	7–1	2nd	
Buena Vista:		24–18–2	20–16–1		
Total:		24–18–2			
