= Steve Conley (running back) =

American football player (born 1949)

No. 38, 47
- Positions: Running back, linebacker

Personal information
- Born: March 9, 1949 (age 77); Chicago, Illinois, U.S.
- Listed height: 6 ft 2 in (1.88 m)
- Listed weight: 225 lb (102 kg)

Career information
- High school: Arlington (Arlington Heights, Illinois)
- College: Kansas
- NFL draft: 1972: 7th round, 158th overall pick

Career history
- Cincinnati Bengals (1972); St. Louis Cardinals (1972); Hamilton Tiger-Cats (1973); Chicago Fire (1974)*; Birmingham Americans (1974); The Hawaiians (1974); Calgary Stampeders (1975)*; San Antonio Wings (1975); Philadelphia Bell (1975)
- * Offseason or practice squad member only
- Stats at Pro Football Reference

Stephen Craig Conley is an American former professional football player who was both a running back and linebacker. He played college football for the Kansas Jayhawks football. He played professionally for the Cincinnati Bengals and St. Louis Cardinals of the National Football League (NFL), and also played in the Canadian Football League (CFL) and the World Football League (WFL).

== College career ==
Conley played high school football at Arlington High School and initially played college football at Arizona Western College. He then transferred to the University of Kansas where he played as a running back. One of his most notable experiences at Kansas was dropping a last second touchdown pass to win a game against arch-rival Kansas State in 1979 which would have won the game, after dreaming the night before he would be involved in a play that would decide the game. The following year he rushed for a touchdown to help beat Kansas State. In October 1970 he was named player of the week for his performance in a game against Nebraska. Until his junior year at Kansas he shared a backfield with future Hall of Famer John Riggins. Conley finished his college career in 1971 with 1064 yards on 253 carries for an average of 4.2 yards per rush. He also scored 10 touchdowns – 8 rushing and 2 receiving.

== Professional career ==
Conley was selected by the Bengals in the 7th round of the 1972 NFL draft, with the 158th overall pick. The Bengals initially wanted to convert Conley to a linebacker because they had lost several linebackers to injury the prior year, and felt that Conley agility would be well suited to the linebacker position. Conley was on the Bengals' taxi squad for the first 6 games of the 1972 season but got a break in late October when the Bengals traded away two running backs, Fred Willis and Paul Robinson, to the Houston Oilers in exchange for wide receiver Charlie Joiner and linebacker Ron Pritchard. The Bengals activated Conley as a backup running back for their October 29 game against the Oilers. Conley rushed for 8 yards on 3 carries in the game, won by the Bengals by a score of 30-7. He also played on special teams and recovered an Oiler fumble on a punt return. This would prove to be the only game Conley would play for the Bengals and the only rushes he would have in his NFL career. A few days after the game the Bengals picked up running back Reece Morrison on waivers and waived Conley.

The Cardinals signed Conley a few days later, primarily to play on special teams, but also a little bit at linebacker. Conley played in all seven of the Cardinals' remaining games in 1972. During the 1973 season the Cardinals moved him back to running back. But the Cardinals released him prior to the regular season. Conley then joined the Hamilton Tiger-Cats of the CFL, where he played as a linebacker and as a slotback. He played 5 games for the Tiger-Cats and caught 5 passes for 47 yards. He also gained 5 yards rushing on 3 attempts for the Tiger-Cats.

In 1974, Conley and several other Hamilton players were in a dispute over their contracts because the league increased the schedule from 14 games to 16 without increasing the players' salaries. Conley briefly joined the Chicago Fire of the WFL but before the season started in July 1974 he was waived and signed by the Birmingham Americans as a tight end and linebacker. He was traded to the Hawaiians during the season, in August. After playing 4 games for the Hawaiians he was cut, but ended up in a dispute with the team over not being paid. He had 1 interception for the Americans and 1 for the Hawaiians that year.

In 1975 Conley joined the Calgary Stampeders of the CFL as a running back but was cut in preseason and then joined the San Antonio Wings of the WFL. He played both running back and linebacker for the Wings. Conley rushed 9 times for 33 yards and caught 2 passes for 33 yards for the Wings. After being cut by the Wings late in the season he was signed by the Philadelphia Bell as a linebacker.
