= Verlie Abrams =

American football player (1921–2008)

No. 10
- Position: Guard

Personal information
- Born: February 5, 1921; Oklahoma City, Oklahoma, U.S.
- Died: September 16, 2008 (aged 87); Old Hickory, Tennessee, U.S.
- Listed height: 6 ft 0 in (1.83 m)
- Listed weight: 200 lb (91 kg)

Career information
- High school: Webb City (MO)
- College: Missouri (1940–42, 1946–47); Notre Dame (1943)

Career history
- Wilmington Clippers (1949)

Awards and highlights
- Second-team All-Big Six (1942)

Verlie Francis Abrams II (February 5, 1921 – September 16, 2008) was an American football guard who played one season in the American Football League (AFL) for the Wilmington Clippers. He played college football for Missouri, graduating in 1948, and appeared in four games for the Clippers in 1949.

== Early life and education ==
Verlie Abrams was born on February 5, 1921, in Oklahoma City. His family moved to Webb City, Missouri when he was young, and he attended Webb City High School there between 1936 and 1939. He joined University of Missouri in 1940, spending his first season on the freshman roster. He joined the varsity team in 1941, and was given a varsity letter in the following two years.

He was drafted to serve in World War II as a member of the United States Marine Corps in 1943, and played for the University of Notre Dame while in service. He was a demolition officer with the Marines, and "blasted Japs out of Okinawa caves, leveled their bridges, changed the courses of rivers so his side could gain," wrote Al Cartwright of The News Journal. "He coached his men to go all-out to blow the enemy out of the way, to be reckless," Cartwright also said. He returned from the war in 1946, and rejoined the University of Missouri. He was named honorable mention all-Big Six following the season. He earned his fourth varsity letter as a senior in 1947 and was named team captain. His final game was the Kansas-Missouri all-star game late in the year.

== Professional career ==
After spending 1948 out of football and working as a safety supervisor for DuPont, Abrams was signed by the Wilmington Clippers in 1949 following a tryout at Wilmington Park. Al Cartwright wrote in The News Journal, "Abrams is this year's surprise package with the Wilmington pros. Not surprising because he's playing so well, but surprising because he merely is with them. While the Clipper officials were scurrying and shopping around for hard-wearing linemen all summer and even early in the season, Abrams just wandered into a Wilmington Park workout late in September and inquired whether or not he could try out for the team. And when the workout was over, the Clippers had themselves a former University of Missouri captain and all-Big Seven selection protecting them in the middle of the line."

"Soon as I heard Wilmington had a pro football team, I decided that was for me," Abrams said. "I didn't play last season because I was busy with post-graduate work at the university, but I stayed in shape with intramural track and basketball and the layoff hasn't affected me a bit. As long as I'm playing football, I'm happy. And, besides that, I believe the Clippers have the makings of a grand club."

As a member of the Clippers, Abrams appeared in four games, starting three, as the Clippers finished with a record of 5–5. They advanced to the playoffs, but lost 0–66 in the first round to the Richmond Rebels. Wilmington folded after the season, ending his professional career.

== Death ==
Abrams died on September 16, 2008, in Old Hickory, Tennessee at the age of 87.
