= Ray Evans (halfback) =

American football player (1922–1999)

No. 42
- Position: Halfback

Personal information
- Born: September 22, 1922; Kansas City, Kansas, U.S.
- Died: April 24, 1999 (aged 76); Prairie Village, Kansas, U.S.
- Listed height: 6 ft 1 in (1.85 m)
- Listed weight: 195 lb (88 kg)

Career information
- High school: Wyandotte (Kansas City)
- College: Kansas (1941–1942, 1946–1947)
- NFL draft: 1944: 1st round, 9th overall pick

Career history
- Pittsburgh Steelers (1948)

Awards and highlights
- First-team All-American (1947); Third-team All-American (1946); 3× First-team All-Big Six (1942, 1946, 1947); Kansas Jayhawks No. 42 retired

Career NFL statistics
- Rushing yards: 343
- Rushing average: 3.5
- Rushing touchdowns: 2
- Passing attempts: 137
- Passing completions: 64
- Completion percentage: 46.7%
- TD–INT: 5–17
- Passing yards: 924
- Military career
- Allegiance: United States
- Branch: United States Army
- Service years: 1944–1946
- Rank: Lieutenant
- Conflicts: World War II
- Stats at Pro Football Reference
- College Football Hall of Fame

Raymond Richard Evans (September 22, 1922 – April 24, 1999) was an American professional football halfback. He was an All-American in football and a twice All-American in basketball at the University of Kansas and is considered possibly the greatest overall athlete ever to attend KU. In addition to his multi-sport prowess in college, Evans would go on to play professional football and basketball, and was even offered a contract to play baseball for the New York Yankees.

== College career ==
=== Football ===
Evans played both halfback on offense and defensive back on defense at KU. During his 1947 All-American season, Evans led the Jayhawks to a Big Six Conference championship and an appearance in the Orange Bowl. He also holds the distinction as the only NCAA football player ever to lead the nation in passing on offense and interceptions on defense in the same season. In fact, Evans is still the Jayhawks single-season (10) and career (17) leader in interceptions.

=== Basketball ===
Evans was also a standout guard on the basketball team. He was an All-American member of the 1943 conference championship team (which also featured Charles B. Black and Otto Schnellbacher).

=== Legacy ===
Evans is the only KU athlete to have his basketball jersey no. 15 and football number 42 retired. (Note: Retired jersey number means that the player's number is still in circulation, and any player can wear it, while retired number means that no player can wear that number again.) His college athletic career was interrupted by three years of service with the United States Army Air Forces during World War II. He was elected to the College Football Hall of Fame in 1964.

== Professional career ==
Evans was drafted by the Chicago Bears in the first round of the 1944 NFL Draft (ninth overall) but was still serving the military at the time and chose to return to school rather than play then. Evans was later drafted by the New York Knicks in the 1947 BAA Draft but chose to play in the National Football League for the Pittsburgh Steelers (1948).

== Business career ==
Evans was the president of the Traders National Bank of Kansas City and was part of a group that owned the Kansas City Kings of the National Basketball Association. Evans died in his home on April 24, 1999, from natural causes.
