= Otto Schnellbacher =

American football and basketball player (1923–2008)

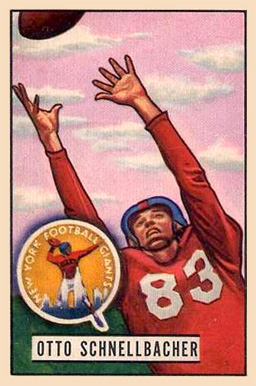
- Schnellbacher on a 1951 Bowman football card
- Born: Otto Ole Schnellbacher; April 15, 1923; Sublette, Kansas, U.S.
- Died: March 10, 2008 (aged 84); Topeka, Kansas, U.S.
- Football career

No. 56, 83
- Positions: Safety, end

Personal information
- Listed height: 6 ft 4 in (1.93 m)
- Listed weight: 188 lb (85 kg)

Career information
- High school: Sublette
- College: Kansas
- NFL draft: 1947: 25th round, 231st overall pick

Career history
- New York Yankees (1948–1949); New York Giants (1950–1951)

Awards and highlights
- First-team All-Pro (1951); 2× Pro Bowl (1950, 1951); NFL interceptions leader (1951); AAFC interceptions leader (1948); 2× First-team All-Big Six (1946, 1947); AAFC record: Most interceptions in a season: 11 (1948)

Career AAFC/NFL statistics
- Interceptions: 34
- Interception yards: 558
- Fumble recoveries: 5
- Defensive touchdowns: 3
- Receptions: 6
- Receiving yards: 83
- Stats at Pro Football Reference
- Basketball career

Career information
- College: Kansas (1942–1943, 1945–1948)
- BAA draft: 1948: 7th round, 79th overall pick
- Drafted by: Providence Steamrollers
- Playing career: 1948–1949
- Position: Forward / Guard
- Number: 7, 9

Career history
- 1948: Providence Steamrollers
- 1948: St. Louis Bombers

Career highlights
- 4× First-team All-Big Six (1943, 1946–1948)
- Stats at NBA.com
- Stats at Basketball Reference

Otto Ole Schnellbacher (April 15, 1923 – March 10, 2008) was an American professional football player who was a safety and end for the New York Yankees of the All-America Football Conference (AAFC) and the New York Giants of the National Football League (NFL). A two-time Pro Bowler, Schnellbacher was the first player in pro football history with multiple seasons of 10 interceptions (1948, 1951); only six other players have had multiple seasons of 10 interceptions since Schnellbacher did so. He also was a professional basketball player, playing for the Basketball Association of America's Providence Steamrollers and St. Louis Bombers in the 1948–49 season.

== College career ==
In college, Schnellbacher was a two-sport star at the University of Kansas, earning him the nickname "the double threat from Sublette". On the gridiron, Schnellbacher, along with teammate Ray Evans, was KU's first football All-American in 1947. That same season, Schnellbacher led the Jayhawks to a Big 6 conference title and an Orange Bowl berth. Schnellbacher also excelled in basketball, where he was a four-time first-team all-conference selection (one of only three Jayhawks to do so). He was a member of the 1943 Big Six conference championship team (which also featured All-American teammates Charles B. Black and the aforementioned Ray Evans) that is regarded as one of the program's greatest teams. In 1972, he was inducted into the Kansas Sports Hall of Fame.

== Professional career ==
He had his first season as a football career in 1948 at the age of 25. He didn't play his first game until the fourth week against the Baltimore Colts, where he made three receptions. Two weeks later, he had his first interceptions as a back against the Buffalo Bills, recording two of them. After having none in his next game, he then went on a streak of seven straight games with an interception, which included two each against Chicago and Los Angeles that saw him record eleven total to lead the All-America Football Conference. His first touchdown came on an interception returned all the way against the Cleveland Browns. He played in just six games the following year. He recorded four interceptions, which included two against Chicago. In the playoffs that year, he recorded three punt returns for 34 yards in the 17–7 loss to the San Francisco 49ers.

He played in six games for the 1950 season but recorded an interception in five of them. This included a three-interception game against the Browns in a 17–13 victory on October 22. He was part of head coach Steve Owen's alignment idea (conceived to deal with the Browns) later called the "Umbrella defense", which had two defensive ends drop from the line of scrimmage with four defensive backs spread out. In the playoffs against the Browns, he returned three punts for 21 yards and recorded an interception in the 8–3 loss.

He closed out his career in 1951 with eight games that saw him intercept a game in each of them (with two-pick games in three of them) to go with two being returned for touchdowns. The eleven interceptions led the NFL, which made him the first person to lead interceptions in two different football leagues. He played his last game versus the New York Yanks at the age of 28 before retiring to become an insurance executive in Topeka. He played in just four seasons but compiled 34 interceptions, which actually was tied for second all-time in NFL history when he retired in 1951 to Frank Reagan, who had 35. Teammate Emlen Tunnell would later surpass him on his way to the Pro Football Hall of Fame.

== Personal life and death ==
Schnellbacher died at the age of 84 from cancer.

== BAA career statistics ==
Legend
GP	Games played	FG%	Field-goal percentage
FT%	Free-throw percentage	APG	Assists per game
PPG	Points per game	**Bold**	Career high

=== Regular season ===
Year	Team	GP	FG%	FT%	APG	PPG
1948–49	Providence	**23**	.288	.630	.8	4.4
1948–49	St. Louis	20	**.364**	**.696**	**2.3**	**8.7**
Career		43	.332	.669	1.5	6.4

=== Playoffs ===
Year	Team	GP	FG%	FT%	APG	PPG
1949	St. Louis	2	.300	.500	3.0	9.0
Career		2	.300	.500	3.0	9.0
