= Jack Mitchell (American football) =

American football player (1923–2009)

Biographical details
- Born: December 3, 1923; Arkansas City, Kansas, U.S.
- Died: July 5, 2009 (aged 85); Sun City, Arizona, U.S.

Playing career
- 1946–1948: Oklahoma
- Position: Quarterback

Coaching career (HC unless noted)
- 1949: Blackwell HS (OK)
- 1950: Tulsa (assistant)
- 1951–1952: Texas Tech (backfield)
- 1953–1954: Wichita
- 1955–1957: Arkansas
- 1958–1966: Kansas

Head coaching record
- Overall: 74–59–7 (college)
- Bowls: 1–0

Accomplishments and honors

Championships
- 1 MVC (1954)

Awards
- Second-team All-American (1948); 2× First-team All-Big Seven (1947, 1948); Second-team All-Big Six (1946)

Jack Churchill Mitchell (December 3, 1923 – July 5, 2009) was an American football player and coach. He served as the head football coach at the Municipal University of Wichita—now known as Wichita State University—from 1953 to 1954, the University of Arkansas from 1955 to 1957, and the University of Kansas from 1958 to 1966. compiling a career college football record of 72–61–7. Mitchell played football at the University of Oklahoma as a quarterback from 1946 to 1948. He was named an All-American in 1948. After retiring from coaching, Mitchell moved to Wellington, Kansas to become a publisher at The Wellington Daily News.

== Coaching career ==
=== Wichita ===
Mitchell was the 21st head football coach for the Municipal University of Wichita, now Wichita State University, located in Wichita, Kansas. He held that position for two seasons, from 1953 until 1954. His overall coaching record at Wichita was 13–5–1.

=== Arkansas ===
From 1954 to 1957, Mitchell was the head football coach at University of Arkansas, where he compiled a 17–12–1 record.

=== Kansas ===
Mitchell was the 28th head football coach for the University of Kansas located in Lawrence, Kansas and he held that position for nine seasons, from 1958 until 1966. His overall coaching record at Kansas was 44–42–5.

== Death ==
Mitchell died on July 5, 2009, in Sun City, Arizona.

== Head coaching record ==
=== College ===
Year	Team	Overall	Conference	Standing	Bowl/playoffs	Coaches^{#}	AP^{°}
Wichita Shockers (Missouri Valley Conference) (1953–1954)
1953	Wichita	4–4–1	1–2	T–3rd			
1954	Wichita	9–1	4–0	1st			
Wichita:		13–5–1	5–2				
Arkansas Razorbacks (Southwest Conference) (1955–1957)
1955	Arkansas	5–4–1	3–2–1	4th			
1956	Arkansas	6–4	3–3	4th			
1957	Arkansas	6–4	2–4	T–5th			
Arkansas:		17–12–1	8–9–1				
Kansas Jayhawks (Big Seven / Big Eight Conference) (1958–1966)
1958	Kansas	4–5–1	3–2–1	4th			
1959	Kansas	5–5	3–3	T–3rd			
1960	Kansas	7–2–1	4–2–1	3rd		9	11
1961	Kansas	7–3–1	5–2	T–2nd	W Bluebonnet	15	
1962	Kansas	6–3–1	4–2–1	4th			
1963	Kansas	5–5	3–4	T–4th			
1964	Kansas	6–4	5–2	3rd			
1965	Kansas	2–8	2–5	T–6th			
1966	Kansas	2–7–1	0–6–1	T–7th			
Kansas:		44–42–5	29–28–4				
Total:		72–61–7					
National championship Conference title Conference division title or championship game berth
^{#}Rankings from final Coaches Poll.; ^{°}Rankings from final AP Poll.
