= John Rapacz =

American football player (1924–1991)

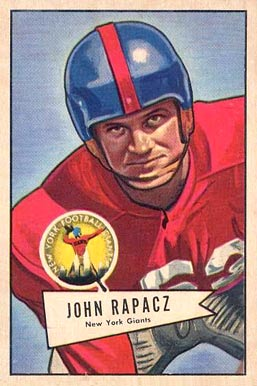
- Rapacz on a 1952 Bowman football card

No. 20, 53
- Positions: Center, linebacker

Personal information
- Born: April 25, 1924; Rosedale, Ohio, U.S.
- Died: January 2, 1991 (aged 66); Midwest City, Oklahoma, U.S.
- Listed height: 6 ft 4 in (1.93 m)
- Listed weight: 252 lb (114 kg)

Career information
- High school: Kalamazoo Central (Kalamazoo, Michigan)
- College: Western Michigan (1942); Oklahoma (1946-1947)
- NFL draft: 1947: 3rd round, 15th overall pick

Career history
- Chicago Rockets / Hornets (1948-1949); New York Giants (1950–1954); Baltimore Colts (1955)

Awards and highlights
- Third-team All-American (1947); 2× First-team All-Big Six (1946, 1947)

Career NFL/AAFC statistics
- Games played: 76
- Games started: 51
- Fumble recoveries: 3
- Stats at Pro Football Reference

John Joseph Rapacz (April 25, 1924 – January 2, 1991) was an American football offensive lineman in the National Football League (NFL) for the New York Giants. He also played in the All-America Football Conference (AAFC) for the Chicago Rockets/Hornets. Rapacz played college football and baseball at the University of Oklahoma, where he was an All-American in football, and was drafted in the third round of the 1947 NFL draft by the Boston Yanks. After retiring from the NFL Rapacz went on to become a Michigan High School Hall of Fame football coach for Hackett Catholic Central High School.
