= Frank Pattee =

American football player (1924–2011)

Profile
- Position: Halfback

Personal information
- Born: March 11, 1924; Smith Center, Kansas, U.S.
- Died: January 5, 2011 (aged 86); Westlake Village, California, U.S.

Career information
- High school: Smith Center (Smith Center, Kansas)
- College: Kansas
- NFL draft: 1949: 23rd round, 228th overall pick

Frank Sondles Pattee (March 11, 1924 – January 5, 2011) was an American football halfback. He was born in Smith Center, Kansas, the son of Addie (née Munson) and John Walter Pattee. He was a star football player at Smith Center High School, and played college football at the University of Kansas in Lawrence, Kansas.

== Playing career ==
Pattee enrolled at Kansas in 1943, before joining the United States Navy where he served stateside in the U.S. Naval Air Force. Frank later returned to Kansas where he played football from 1945 through 1948, lettering all four years. He was the starting fullback on Kansas' 1948 Orange Bowl team as well as one of the starting linebackers. Frank was instrumental as one of the most versatile players on the team which led to him also filling in at several other positions while at Kansas and during the 1948 Orange Bowl game. This versatility lead to him being named the team captain of the 1948 Kansas football team as well. After graduating in 1949, he was drafted in the sixth round of the 1949 AAFC as the 41st overall pick by the Baltimore Colts, and in the 23rd round of the 1949 NFL draft as the 228th overall pick by the Washington Redskins, but chose not to pursue a career in professional football.

== Later life and legacy ==
Pattee married Betty Jo O'Neal on June 16, 1946, at the Danforth Chapel on the campus of Kansas. Passing on a career in professional football, he initially pursued a career in business with the Cities Services Oil Company, then later a career with the U.S. Department of Transportation.

Frank and Betty Jo had two sons and two daughters, Frank Pattee Jr., Thomas Pattee, Jodie Knight, and Erin Brockovich. His daughter Erin Brockovich went on to fame as a law clerk who became internationally notable as the subject of an eponymous movie starring Julia Roberts (for which Roberts won the Best Actress Academy Award).

Pattee died on Wednesday, January 5, 2011, in Westlake Village, California. He was buried later that year in Pioneer Cemetery in Lawrence, Kansas alongside his wife.
