= 1946 All-Big Six Conference football team =

The 1946 All-Big Six Conference football team consists of American football players chosen by the Associated Press (AP) and the United Press (UP) as the best players at each position among teams playing in the Big Six Conference during the 1946 college football season.

== All-Big Six selections ==
=== Backs ===
- Ray Evans, Kansas (AP-1, UP-1)
- Joe Golding, Oklahoma (AP-1, UP-1)
- Loyd Brinkman, Missouri (AP-1, UP-1)
- Tom Novak, Nebraska (AP-1, UP-2)
- Dick Hutton, Nebraska (AP-2, UP-1)
- Sam Vacanti, Nebraska (AP-2, UP-2)
- Bob Hopkins, Missouri (AP-2, UP-2)
- Jack Mitchell, Oklahoma (AP-2, UP-2)
- Frank Pattee, Kansas (UP-3)
- Dick Howard, Iowa State (UP-3)
- Bud French, Kansas (UP-3)
- Eddy Davis, Oklahoma (UP-3)

=== Ends ===
- Roland Oakes, Missouri (AP-1, UP-1)
- Otto Schnellbacher, Kansas (AP-1, UP-1)
- David Schmidt, Kansas (AP-2, UP-2)
- Jim Tyree, Oklahoma (AP-2, UP-3)
- Dean Laun, Iowa State (UP-2)
- Marshall Shurnas, Missouri (UP-3)

=== Tackles ===
- Wade Walker, Oklahoma (AP-1, UP-1)
- Jim Kekeris, Missouri (AP-1, UP-1)
- Carl Samuelson, Nebraska (AP-2, UP-2)
- Homer Paine, Oklahoma (AP-2, UP-2)
- Huck Heath, Kansas State (UP-3)
- Don Ettinger, Kansas (UP-3)

=== Guards ===
- Plato Andros, Oklahoma (AP-1, UP-1)
- Don Fambrough, Kansas (AP-1, UP-1)
- Ed Schwartzkopf, Nebraska (AP-2, UP-3)
- Buddy Burris, Oklahoma (AP-2, UP-2)
- Edgar McNeil, Kansas State (UP-2)
- Verlie Abrams, Missouri (UP-3)

=== Centers ===
- John Rapacz, Oklahoma (AP-1, UP-1)
- Ralph Stewart, Missouri (AP-2, UP-2)
- Joe Partington, Nebraska (UP-3)

== Key ==
AP = Associated Press UP = United Press

== See also ==
- 1946 College Football All-America Team
