= 1974 Iowa State Cyclones football team =

American college football season

1974 Iowa State Cyclones football
- Conference: Big Eight Conference
- Record: 4–7 (2–5 Big 8)
- Head coach: Earle Bruce (2nd season)
- Offensive coordinator: Bob Seaman (1st season)
- Defensive coordinator: Tom Harper (1st season)
- Captains: Phil Danowsky; Rick Howe; Mike Strachan
- Home stadium: Clyde Williams Field

1974 Big Eight Conference football standings
	Conf.					Overall
Team	W		L		T	W		L		T
No. 1 Oklahoma $	7	–	0	–	0	11	–	0	–	0
Missouri	5	–	2	–	0	7	–	4	–	0
No. 9 Nebraska	5	–	2	–	0	9	–	3	–	0
Oklahoma State	4	–	3	–	0	7	–	5	–	0
Colorado	3	–	4	–	0	5	–	6	–	0
Iowa State	2	–	5	–	0	4	–	7	–	0
Kansas	1	–	6	–	0	4	–	7	–	0
Kansas State	1	–	6	–	0	4	–	7	–	0
$ – Conference champion; Rankings from AP Poll

The 1974 Iowa State Cyclones football team represented Iowa State University in the Big Eight Conference during the 1974 NCAA Division I football season. In their second year under head coach Earle Bruce, the Cyclones compiled a 4–7 record (2–5 against conference opponents), finished in sixth place in the conference, and were outscored by opponents by a combined total of 198 to 186.

This was the Cyclones' final season playing their home games at Clyde Williams Field before moving into the modern Jack Trice Stadium, where Iowa State has played ever since.

Phil Danowsky, Rick Howe, and Mike Strachan were the team captains.

== Schedule ==
Date	Time	Opponent	Site	Result	Attendance	Source
September 14	7:30 pm	at Texas Tech*	Jones Stadium; Lubbock, TX	L 3–24	38,542	
September 21	3:30 pm	at Washington*	Husky Stadium; Seattle, WA	L 28–31	47,500	
September 28	1:30 pm	BYU*	Clyde Williams Field; Ames, IA	W 34–7	29,419	
October 5	1:30 pm	New Mexico*	Clyde Williams Field; Ames, IA	W 27–3	31,529	
October 12	2:30 pm	at Colorado	Folsom Field; Boulder, CO	L 7–34	50,793	
October 19	1:30 pm	Kansas State^{†}	Clyde Williams Field; Ames, IA (rivalry)	W 23–18	35,000	
October 26	1:30 pm	at Kansas	Memorial Stadium; Lawrence, KS	W 22–6	35,100	
November 2	1:30 pm	No. 2 Oklahoma	Clyde Williams Field; Ames, IA	L 10–28	35,000	
November 9	1:30 pm	No. 9 Nebraska	Clyde Williams Field; Ames, IA (rivalry)	L 13–23	37,000	
November 16	1:30 pm	at Missouri	Faurot Field; Columbia, MO (rivalry)	L 7–10	48,642	
November 23	1:30 pm	at Oklahoma State	Lewis Field; Stillwater, OK	L 12–14	28,200	
*Non-conference game; ^{†}Homecoming; Rankings from AP Poll released prior to the game; All times are in Central time

== Personnel ==
=== Coaching staff ===
Name	Position	Year at Iowa State	Previous job
Earle Bruce	Head coach	2nd	Tampa (HC)
Tom Harper	Defensive coordinator	1st	Jacksonville Sharks (DC)
Bob Seaman	Offensive coordinator	1st	Wichita State (HC)
Dante Scarnecchia	Defensive rovers, secondary	2nd	California Western (OL)
Charlie Lyle	Secondary	2nd	Tampa (asst.)
Tom Backhus	Offensive guards, centers	2nd	Tampa (asst.)
Bob Tucker	Defensive ends	2nd	Wichita State (asst.)
Keith Kephart	Junior varsity coach	7th	
Larry Hunt	Assistant defensive line	1st	First coaching job
Tom Lichtenberg	Offensive backfield	1st	Morehead State
John Wiley	Recruiting	1st	Iowa
Randy Hart	Defensive tackles	2nd	Tampa (asst.)
Al Lavan	Wide Receivers	1st	Louisville
Rick Bankston	Defensive guards, strength	2nd	Tampa (asst.)

=== Roster ===
1974 Iowa State Cyclones football team roster
Players
Coaches
Offense

Pos.	#	Name	Class
QB	8	Buddy Hardeman	So
QB	9	Rusty Shelley	So
QB	10	Mike Tryon	So
QB	12	Tom Mason	Jr
ROV	18	Wayne Stanley	Jr
RB	20	Mike Williams	So
FB	22	Ed Morton	Jr
FB	23	Frank Cooper	So
WR	25	Sheldon Morton	So
WR	27	Forry Smith	Jr
RB	28	John Solomon	Fr
WR	32	Jerry Moses	Sr
RB	33	Mike Strachan	Sr
WR	34	Jim Wingender	Jr
FB	36	Clarence Isler	Fr
RB	37	Neal Moses	So
FB	40	Phil Danowsky	Sr
WR	42	Greg Grove	Jr
FB	43	Curtis Bryant	So
WR	48	Anthony Norman	So
C	53	Jeff Jones	Jr
C	54	John Fritsch	Jr
G	55	Rod Stoffel	So
OT	57	Arlen Ciechanowski	Sr
G	59	Jack Thomas	Jr
OT	62	John Wodziak	So
OT	64	Terry Andringa	Sr
G	65	Rick Chiaculas	Jr
C	66	Terry Reelitz	Jr
G	67	Bob Bos	Jr
G	69	Wally Yelverton	So
OT	70	Randy Young	So
OT	71	Greg Miller	So
OT	72	Karl Schueneman	So
G	73	Sherman Miller	Sr
G	75	Dave Greenwood	So
OT	78	Jon McCarthy	Jr
WR	80	Dave Brosher	So
WR	81	Nelson Taylor	Fr
WR	82	Clive Sands	Jr
WR	83	Rob Overton	Sr
WR	85	Al Dixon	So
WR	87	Steve Hicks	So
TE	88	Guy Preston	Fr
TE	89	Glover Rogers	So
TE	96	Kevin Cartier	Jr

Defense

Pos.	#	Name	Class
S	13	Lorenzo Johnson	Jr
ROV	14	Tony Hawkins	So
ROV	16	Mark Williams	Jr
CB	17	Jerry Jaksich	So
CB	19	Ramsey Jay	Sr
CB	23	Steve Wilson	So
S	24	Rob Bolks	Sr
DE	25	Joe Palmisano	Jr
CB	31	Bill Larkin	So
CB	35	Rick Blabolil	Fr
ROV	38	Sy Bassett	Sr
LB	39	Mike Larsen	Fr
LB	41	Gerry Forge	Sr
LB	43	Bruce Beaman	Sr
S	44	Barry Hill	Sr
LB	45	Mark Clarey	So
ROV	47	Barry Barritt	So
LB	49	Mike Gnade	Jr
DL	50	Jimmy Potter	Jr
LB	51	Lagrant Anthony	So
DE	52	Craig Volkens	So
DT	56	Rick Howe	Sr
LB	58	Bob Police	So
LB	60	Brad Storm	Sr
DT	61	Ron McFarland	So
DT	63	Dan Hanover	So
DT	63	Mike Stensrud	Fr
DT	64	Tom Randall	Fr
DL	68	Kevin Cunningham	Fr
G	74	Mitch Omer	So
DT	76	Bob Herman	Sr
DT	77	Gerry Petsch	So
DT	79	Mitch Hallett	Sr
DE	90	Maynard Stensrud	So
DE	92	Andre Roundtree	Sr
DE	93	Lenzy Perine	So
DE	94	Les Leonard	Jr
DE	95	Ray King	Jr
DT	96	Duane Ohrt	Sr
LB	97	Mark Benda	So
DT	98	Pierre Gelinas	Jr

Special teams

Pos.	#	Name	Class
K	5	Scott Kollman	So
K	21	Scott Bradley	Sr
K	29	Tom Goedjen	Sr
K	97	Doug Lenth	Jr

Head coach

- Earle Bruce (2nd year)

Coordinators/assistant coaches

- Tom Harper (DC)
- Bob Seaman (OC)
- Dante Scarnecchia (Secondary)
- Charlie Lyle (Secondary)
- Tom Backhus (G/C)
- Bob Tucker (DE)
- Larry Hunt (asst. DL)
- Tom Lichtenberg (Off. Backfield)
- John Wiley (Rec.)
- Keith Kephart (JV)
- Randy Hart (DT)
- Al Lavan (WR)
- Rick Bankston (Def. Guards/Strength)

Legend

- (C) Team captain
- (S) Suspended
- (I) Ineligible
- Injured
- Redshirt
