= 1974 Oklahoma State Cowboys football team =

American college football season

1974 Oklahoma State Cowboys football

Fiesta Bowl champion

Fiesta Bowl, W 16–6, vs. BYU
- Conference: Big Eight Conference
- Record: 7–5 (4–3 Big 8)
- Head coach: Jim Stanley (2nd season)
- Home stadium: Lewis Field

1974 Big Eight Conference football standings
	Conf.					Overall
Team	W		L		T	W		L		T
No. 1 Oklahoma $	7	–	0	–	0	11	–	0	–	0
Missouri	5	–	2	–	0	7	–	4	–	0
No. 9 Nebraska	5	–	2	–	0	9	–	3	–	0
Oklahoma State	4	–	3	–	0	7	–	5	–	0
Colorado	3	–	4	–	0	5	–	6	–	0
Iowa State	2	–	5	–	0	4	–	7	–	0
Kansas	1	–	6	–	0	4	–	7	–	0
Kansas State	1	–	6	–	0	4	–	7	–	0
$ – Conference champion; Rankings from AP Poll

The 1974 Oklahoma State Cowboys football team represented Oklahoma State University in the Big Eight Conference during the 1974 NCAA Division I football season. In their second season under head coach Jim Stanley, the Cowboys compiled a 7–5 record (4–3 against conference opponents), finished in fourth place in the conference, and outscored opponents by a combined total of 262 to 183.

The team's statistical leaders included George Palmer with 516 rushing yards, Charlie Weatherbie with 622 passing yards, and Gerald Bain with 336 receiving yards.

The team played its home games at Lewis Field in Stillwater, Oklahoma.

== Schedule ==
Date	Opponent	Rank	Site	TV	Result	Attendance	Source
September 14	Wichita State*		Lewis Field; Stillwater, OK		W 59–0	34,000	
September 21	at No. 10 Arkansas*		War Memorial Stadium; Little Rock, AR		W 26–7	54,535	
September 28	at Baylor*	No. 12	Baylor Stadium; Waco, TX		L 14–31	30,000	
October 5	at No. 10 Texas Tech*		Jones Stadium; Lubbock, TX		L 13–14	42,158	
October 19	Missouri		Lewis Field; Stillwater, OK		W 31–7	49,300	
October 26	at No. 9 Nebraska		Memorial Stadium; Lincoln, NE		L 3–7	76,476	
November 2	Kansas^{†}		Lewis Field; Stillwater, OK		W 24–13	27,500	
November 9	at Kansas State	No. 17	KSU Stadium; Manhattan, KS		W 29–5	18,000	
November 16	Colorado	No. 18	Lewis Field; Stillwater, OK	ABC	L 20–37	38,500	
November 23	Iowa State		Lewis Field; Stillwater, OK		W 14–12	28,200	
November 30	at No. 1 Oklahoma		Oklahoma Memorial Stadium; Norman, OK (Bedlam Series)		L 13–44	61,826	
December 28	vs. No. 17 BYU*		Sun Devil Stadium; Tempe, AZ (Fiesta Bowl)	CBS	W 16–6	50,878	
*Non-conference game; ^{†}Homecoming; Rankings from AP Poll released prior to the game

== Roster ==
1974 Oklahoma State Cowboys football team roster
Players
Coaches
Offense

Pos.	#	Name	Class
OT	72	Derrel Gofourth	So
RB	43	Terry Miller	Fr
RB	44	Leonard Thompson	Sr
QB	15	Charlie Weatherbie	So
OT	77	Tom Wolf	Sr

Defense

Pos.	#	Name	Class
DT	91	Phil Dokes	So
DT	87	Calvin Miller	Sr
CB	29	Reggie Pierson	Sr
DT	92	James White	Jr

Special teams

Pos.	#	Name	Class
P	2	Cliff Parsley	So

Head coach

- Jim Stanley

Coordinators/assistant coaches

Legend

- (C) Team captain
- (S) Suspended
- (I) Ineligible
- Injured
- Redshirt

== After the season ==
The 1975 NFL draft was held on January 28–29, 1975. The following Cowboy was selected.

Round	Pick	Player	Position	NFL club
8	194	Leonard Thompson	Wide receiver	Detroit Lions
