= 1974 Colorado Buffaloes football team =

American college football season

1974 Colorado Buffaloes football
- Conference: Big Eight Conference
- Record: 5–6 (3–4 Big 8)
- Head coach: Bill Mallory (1st season)
- Offensive coordinator: George Belu (1st season)
- Offensive scheme: I formation
- Defensive coordinator: Bob Reublin (1st season)
- Base defense: 5–2
- MVP: Harvey Goodman
- Captains: Jeff Geiser; Doug Payton; Greg Westbrooks
- Home stadium: Folsom Field

1974 Big Eight Conference football standings
	Conf.					Overall
Team	W		L		T	W		L		T
No. 1 Oklahoma $	7	–	0	–	0	11	–	0	–	0
Missouri	5	–	2	–	0	7	–	4	–	0
No. 9 Nebraska	5	–	2	–	0	9	–	3	–	0
Oklahoma State	4	–	3	–	0	7	–	5	–	0
Colorado	3	–	4	–	0	5	–	6	–	0
Iowa State	2	–	5	–	0	4	–	7	–	0
Kansas	1	–	6	–	0	4	–	7	–	0
Kansas State	1	–	6	–	0	4	–	7	–	0
$ – Conference champion; Rankings from AP Poll

The 1974 Colorado Buffaloes football team was an American football team that represented the University of Colorado in the Big Eight Conference during the 1974 NCAA Division I football season. In their first season under head coach Bill Mallory, the Buffaloes compiled a 5–6 record (3–4 in Big 8, fifth), and were outscored 307 to 226. Home games were played on campus at Folsom Field in Boulder, Colorado.

Hired in January, Mallory was previously the head coach at undefeated Miami University in Oxford, Ohio, where he led the 1973 Miami Redskins football team to an undefeated season.

== Schedule ==
Date	Opponent	Site	TV	Result	Attendance	Source
September 14	at No. 9 LSU*	Tiger Stadium; Baton Rouge, LA		L 14–42	70,274	
September 21	at No. 6 Michigan*	Michigan Stadium; Ann Arbor, MI		L 0–31	91,203	
September 28	No. 11 Wisconsin*	Folsom Field; Boulder, CO		W 24–21	50,512	
October 5	at Air Force*	Falcon Stadium; Colorado Springs, CO		W 28–27	38,354	
October 12	Iowa State^{†}	Folsom Field; Boulder, CO		W 34–7	50,793	
October 19	No. 2 Oklahoma	Folsom Field; Boulder, CO		L 14–49	51,777	
October 26	at Missouri	Faurot Field; Columbia, MO		L 24–30	61,023	
November 2	No. 9 Nebraska	Folsom Field; Boulder, CO (rivalry)	ABC	L 15–31	52,049	
November 9	Kansas	Folsom Field; Boulder, CO		W 17–16	48,831	
November 16	at No. 18 Oklahoma State	Lewis Field; Stillwater, OK	ABC	W 37–20	38,500	
November 23	at Kansas State	KSU Stadium; Manhattan, KS (rivalry)		L 19–33	12,000	
*Non-conference game; ^{†}Homecoming; Rankings from AP Poll released prior to the game
