= 1974 Kansas Jayhawks football team =

American college football season

1974 Kansas Jayhawks football
- Conference: Big Eight Conference
- Record: 4–7 (1–6 Big 8)
- Head coach: Don Fambrough (4th season)
- Defensive coordinator: Jim Dickey (2nd season)
- Captains: Robert Miller; Steve Towle
- Home stadium: Memorial Stadium

1974 Big Eight Conference football standings
	Conf.					Overall
Team	W		L		T	W		L		T
No. 1 Oklahoma $	7	–	0	–	0	11	–	0	–	0
Missouri	5	–	2	–	0	7	–	4	–	0
No. 9 Nebraska	5	–	2	–	0	9	–	3	–	0
Oklahoma State	4	–	3	–	0	7	–	5	–	0
Colorado	3	–	4	–	0	5	–	6	–	0
Iowa State	2	–	5	–	0	4	–	7	–	0
Kansas	1	–	6	–	0	4	–	7	–	0
Kansas State	1	–	6	–	0	4	–	7	–	0
$ – Conference champion; Rankings from AP Poll

The 1974 Kansas Jayhawks football team represented the University of Kansas in the Big Eight Conference during the 1974 NCAA Division I football season. In their fourth and final season under head coach Don Fambrough, the Jayhawks compiled a 4–7 record (1–6 against conference opponents), tied for last place in the conference, and were outscored by their opponents by a combined total of 247 to 157. They played their home games at Memorial Stadium in Lawrence, Kansas.

The team's statistical leaders included Scott McMichael with 1,044 passing yards, Laverne Smith with 1,181 rushing yards and Emmett Edwards with 542 receiving yards. Robert Miller and Steve Towle were the team captains.

== Schedule ==
Date	Opponent	Rank	Site	Result	Attendance	Source
September 14	at Washington State*		Joe Albi Stadium; Spokane, WA	W 14–7	29,350	
September 21	at No. 17 Tennessee*		Neyland Stadium; Knoxville, TN	L 3–17	71,610	
September 28	Florida State*		Memorial Stadium; Lawrence, KS	W 40–9	38,780	
October 5	No. 5 Texas A&M*		Memorial Stadium; Lawrence, KS	W 28–10	36,230	
October 12	at Kansas State	No. 19	KSU Stadium; Manhattan, KS (rivalry)	W 20–13	45,000	
October 19	No. 12 Nebraska	No. 13	Memorial Stadium; Lawrence, KS (rivalry)	L 0–56	52,300	
October 26	Iowa State^{†}		Memorial Stadium; Lawrence, KS	L 6–22	35,100	
November 2	at Oklahoma State		Lewis Field; Stillwater, OK	L 13–24	27,500	
November 9	at Colorado		Folsom Field; Boulder, CO	L 16–17	48,831	
November 16	No. 1 Oklahoma		Memorial Stadium; Lawrence, KS	L 14–45	44,500	
November 23	at Missouri		Faurot Field; Columbia, MO (Border War)	L 3–27	56,193	
*Non-conference game; ^{†}Homecoming; Rankings from AP Poll released prior to the game

== Roster ==
1974 Kansas Jayhawks football team roster
Players
Coaches
Offense

Pos.	#	Name	Class
WR	22	Paul Bower	Jr
WR	25	Bruce Adams	Sr
WR	47	Emmett Edwards	Sr
FB	33	Steve Elliott	Jr
G	66	Mike Englebrake	Sr
TE	84	Jerry Gilmore	Jr
TE	88	Gregg Hosack	Jr
QB	10	Scott McMichael	Jr
QB	11	Jud Mitchell	Jr
G	67	David Hentges	Jr
G	71	Leonard Schmitz	Jr
FB	32	Robert Miller	Sr
RB	17	Randy Ross	Sr
WR	83	Ken Saathoff	Sr
OT	76	Dave Scott	Jr
OT	70	Gordon Stockemer	Sr

Defense

Pos.	#	Name	Class
LB	51	Dean Baird	Sr
DB	9	Nolan Cromwell	So
FS	30	Jim David	Jr
S		Chris Golub	So
DE	68	Don Goode	Sr
CB	18	Kurt Knoff	Jr
DT	45	Mike Lemon	Sr
LB	53	Randy Robinson	Sr
CB	34	Steve Taylor	Jr
LB	50	Steve Towle	Sr
DE	87	Dean Zook	Sr

Special teams

Pos.	#	Name	Class
K	31	Bob Swift	Jr

Head coach

- Don Fambrough

Coordinators/assistant coaches

Legend

- (C) Team captain
- (S) Suspended
- (I) Ineligible
- Injured
- Redshirt

== Team players in the NFL ==
Player	Position	Round	Pick	NFL club
Emmett Edwards	Wide Receiver	2	40	Houston Oilers
Bruce Adams	Wide Recelver	4	103	Minnesota Vikings
Robert Miller	Running Back	5	129	Minnesota Vikings
Steve Towle	Linebacker	6	143	Miami Dolphins
Mike Lemon	Linebacker	6	149	New Orleans Saints
