= 1974 Sugar Bowl =

American college football game

- 41st Sugar Bowl
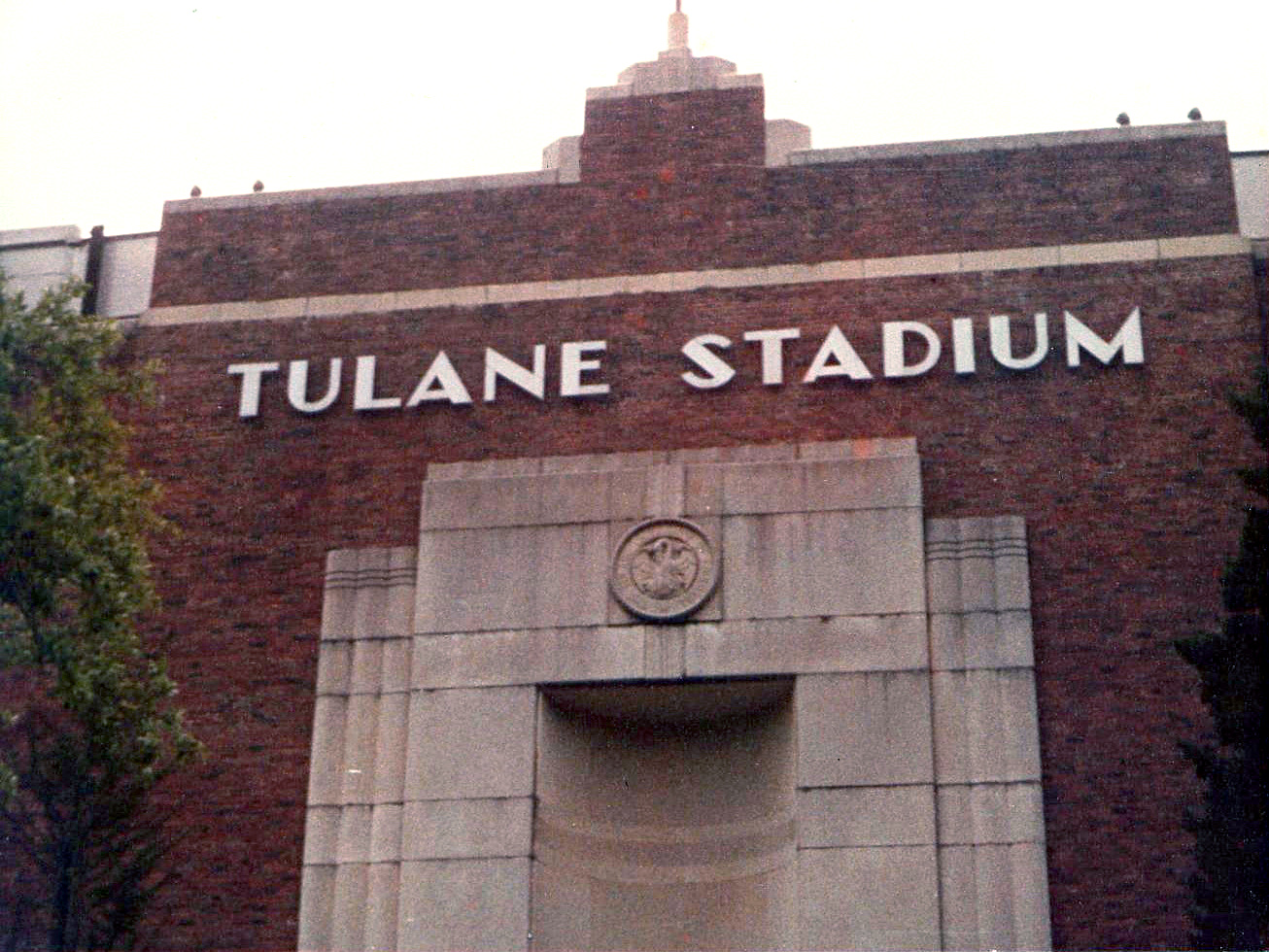
- Tulane Stadium in New Orleans, Louisiana, hosted the Sugar Bowl.
| Nebraska Cornhuskers | Florida Gators |
| (8–3) | (8–3) |
| Big 8 | SEC |
| 13 | 10 |
| Head coach: Tom Osborne | Head coach: Doug Dickey |
| AP / Coaches; 8 / 7 | AP / Coaches; 18 / 14 |
| | 1 | 2 | 3 | 4 | Total |
|---|---|---|---|---|---|
| Nebraska | 0 | 0 | 0 | 13 | 13 |
| Florida | 7 | 3 | 0 | 0 | 10 |
- Date: December 31, 1974
- Season: 1974
- Stadium: Tulane Stadium
- Location: New Orleans, Louisiana
- MVP: Tony Davis (Nebraska RB)
- Favorite: Nebraska by 13 points
- Referee: Earl Shostrom (Big 8) (split crew: Big 8, SEC)
- Halftime show: Harold "Harry" Love Grimes
- Attendance: 67,890

United States TV coverage
- Network: ABC
- Announcers: Keith Jackson, Barry Switzer

The 1974 Sugar Bowl was the 41st edition of the Sugar Bowl, a college football bowl game traditionally held in New Orleans, Louisiana. It was played on New Year's Eve at the conclusion of the 1974 NCAA Division I football season and featured the #8 ranked Nebraska Cornhuskers of the Big Eight Conference and the #18 ranked Florida Gators of the Southeastern Conference. Both teams featured stout defenses, and at the end of three quarters, the underdog Gators held a 10–0 lead over the favored Huskers, who had committed five turnovers up to that point. However, Nebraska relied on its strong running game in the final period to rally for a 13–10 win, the program's first Sugar Bowl victory.

The 1974 Sugar Bowl was the last played at Tulane Stadium, which also hosted the Super Bowl for the final time just twelve days later. The Sugar Bowl moved indoors to the new Louisiana Superdome for the 1975 edition.

== Teams ==
=== Nebraska ===
The Huskers entered the Sugar Bowl with an 8–3 record and were ranked #8 in the AP poll. They finished third in the Big Eight Conference and closed the regular season with a loss to rival Oklahoma. Nebraska was led by second team All American quarterback David Humm and an I formation offense that featured an offensive line which placed three out of five starters on the 1974 All-Big Eight Conference football team. This was the Huskers' second appearance in the contest, as they had lost to Alabama in the 1967 Sugar Bowl.

=== Florida ===
The Gators were also 8-3 leading up to the Sugar Bowl but had plummeted from #6 to #18 in the AP poll after having lost two of three games to end the regular season, dropping them to fifth place in the SEC standings. They were the only team ranked in the bottom of the top 20 to appear in a major bowl game that season. Head coach Doug Dickey had debuted the wishbone offense in 1974, and with quarterback Don Gaffney guiding the option attack, Florida relied heavily on its running game along with a stout defense that had five starters named to the 1974 All-SEC football team. This was also the Gators' second trip to the Sugar Bowl, as they had lost to Missouri in the 1966 edition.

== Game summary ==
The game kicked off shortly after 7 p.m. CST on New Year's Eve and was televised by ABC. Because the game did not sell out, it was blacked out in New Orleans and Baton Rouge.

Both defenses asserted themselves early, and Florida got on the scoreboard first when running back Tony Green ran for a 21-yard touchdown after an interception. Neither team could sustain a drive until late in the second quarter, when the Gators moved into Nebraska territory and kicked a field goal to build a 10–0 halftime lead.

The score was unchanged in the third quarter when Nebraska QB David Humm threw his fourth interception against just two completed passes. Florida gained possession at the Nebraska 35-yard line and appeared to take a commanding lead soon thereafter when Tony Green ran 18 yards down the sideline for an apparent touchdown, but the officials incorrectly ruled that he had stepped out of bounds at the five-yard line. Florida soon faced fourth and goal from inside the Nebraska one yard line and coach Doug Dickey chose to leave his offense on the field. The Gators ran an option pitch to the left side and running back James Richards slipped and fell while trying to cut towards the goal line, giving Nebraska possession on downs.

Nebraska head coach Tom Osborne inserted reserve quarterback Terry Luck into the game as his offense lined up in the shadow of their own goal posts, but the backup would not factor prominently in the outcome. Instead, Osborne turned to his running backs, as the Huskers mounted an 18-play, 99-yard drive that consumed almost nine minutes off the clock and did not include a forward pass. The lengthy drive culminated in a short touchdown run by freshman back Monte Anthony early in the fourth quarter, cutting the Gators' lead to 10–7.

Florida was forced to punt on their next possession, and Nebraska again used their ground game to slowly move the ball down the field. After converting on fourth and two from the Florida 49-yard line, the Huskers tied the game at 10–10 on a Mike Coyle field goal with 7:12 remaining. Florida's offense was again unable to move the ball, and after another punt, Nebraska took possession at their own 25 with about four minutes left. Nebraska continuing to rely on its bruising running attack against a tiring Gator defense, which nevertheless seemed to slow the Huskers' offense until running back Tony Davis broke free on a 41-yard run into Florida territory, setting up a 39-yard field goal with 1:46 remaining to give Nebraska the lead. Florida QB Don Gaffney's last-minute Hail Mary pass was intercepted, and Nebraska held on for a 13–10 win.

Nebraska's running backs gained over 300 yards in the contest led by Sugar Bowl MVP Tony Davis. Davis rushed 17 times for 126 yards in the game, with 112 of those yards gained in the second half.

=== Scoring ===
First quarter

- Fla – Tony Green 21-yard run (David Posey kick)

Second quarter

- Fla – Posey 40-yard field goal

Third quarter

No scoring

Fourth quarter

- Neb – Monte Anthony 2-yard run (Mike Coyle kick)
- Neb – Coyle 37-yard field goal
- Neb – Coyle 39-yard field goal

== Statistics ==
| Statistics | Nebraska | Florida |
|---|---|---|
| First downs | 18 | 13 |
| Rushes–yards | 60–304 | 55–178 |
| Passing yards | 16 | 97 |
| Passes | 2–14–4 | 5–10–1 |
| Total offense | 74–320 | 65–275 |
| Punts–average | 4–37.0 | 6–32.5 |
| Fumbles–lost | 3–1 | 3–1 |
| Turnovers | 5 | 2 |
| Penalties–yards | 1–17 | 5–41 |

== Aftermath ==
- Due to the fact that Nebraska was a heavy favorite yet trailed for much of the contest, the Huskers fell one spot to #9 in the final AP poll despite their bowl victory while Florida moved up three spots to #15 despite losing three of their last four games.
- The victory marked the sixth consecutive bowl win for the Huskers. The streak ended the following year at the Fiesta Bowl.
- Nebraska returned for two subsequent Sugar Bowls while Florida has returned seven times due to the Southeastern Conference's tie-in with the game.
- The two football programs have met on only one other occasion: the 1996 Fiesta Bowl, in which Nebraska beat Florida to claim the national championship for the 1995 season.
- The 1974 Sugar Bowl was the last college football game played at Tulane Stadium, which was made obsolete by the completion of the Louisiana Superdome a few months later. The older venue was demolished in 1980.
- The broadcast of this Sugar Bowl is unique in that it remains the only one with a broadcaster (then-Oklahoma head coach Barry Switzer) having been the winner of that year's National Championship. Switzer's Sooners won the Big 8 Conference and finished the season 11–0, but were ineligible for any postseason bowls and barred from television that season due to probation. Despite this, Oklahoma still managed to secure a share of the title via the AP Poll when previously unbeaten Alabama fell to Notre Dame in the Orange Bowl 13–11.
  - Working as an analyst for ABC, both Switzer and longtime Sugar Bowl play-by-play man Keith Jackson donned tuxedos for the broadcast, as the game was still played on New Year's Eve.
