= Tom Ruud =

American football player (born 1953)

No. 54, 51
- Position: Linebacker

Personal information
- Born: July 26, 1953 (age 73); Olivia, Minnesota, U.S.
- Listed height: 6 ft 3 in (1.91 m)
- Listed weight: 223 lb (101 kg)

Career information
- High school: Bloomington (MN) Jefferson
- College: Nebraska
- NFL draft: 1975: 1st round, 19th overall pick

Career history
- Buffalo Bills (1975–1977); Cincinnati Bengals (1978–1979)

Awards and highlights
- First-team All-Big Eight (1974)

Career NFL statistics
- Games played: 59
- Games started: 3
- Fumble recoveries: 5
- Stats at Pro Football Reference

Thomas Robert Ruud (born July 26, 1953) is an American former professional football player who was a linebacker for the Buffalo Bills and Cincinnati Bengals of the National Football League (NFL). At 6'3" 223 lb, he played college football for the Nebraska Cornhuskers from 1972-74. At the 1975 NFL draft, Ruud was selected in the first round (19th overall) by the Buffalo Bills. He played three seasons with the Bills and two with the Cincinnati Bengals.

Ruud's NFL career began with a contract holdout, which caused him to miss most of his rookie season's training camp.

Tom Ruud is a 1971 graduate of Jefferson High School in Bloomington, Minnesota. His sons Barrett and Bo both played football at Nebraska and were selected in the NFL Draft.
