= 1974 Missouri Tigers football team =

American college football season

1974 Missouri Tigers football
- Conference: Big Eight Conference
- Record: 7–4 (5–2 Big 8)
- Head coach: Al Onofrio (4th season)
- Home stadium: Memorial Stadium

1974 Big Eight Conference football standings
| | Conf. | | | | | Overall |
| Team | W | | L | | T | W | | L | | T |
|---|---|---|---|---|---|---|---|---|---|---|
| No. 1 Oklahoma $ | 7 | – | 0 | – | 0 | 11 | – | 0 | – | 0 |
| Missouri | 5 | – | 2 | – | 0 | 7 | – | 4 | – | 0 |
| No. 9 Nebraska | 5 | – | 2 | – | 0 | 9 | – | 3 | – | 0 |
| Oklahoma State | 4 | – | 3 | – | 0 | 7 | – | 5 | – | 0 |
| Colorado | 3 | – | 4 | – | 0 | 5 | – | 6 | – | 0 |
| Iowa State | 2 | – | 5 | – | 0 | 4 | – | 7 | – | 0 |
| Kansas | 1 | – | 6 | – | 0 | 4 | – | 7 | – | 0 |
| Kansas State | 1 | – | 6 | – | 0 | 4 | – | 7 | – | 0 |
$ – Conference champion; Rankings from AP Poll

The 1974 Missouri Tigers football team was an American football team that represented the University of Missouri in the Big Eight Conference (Big 8) during the 1974 NCAA Division I football season. The team compiled a 7–4 record (5–2 against Big 8 opponents), finished in a tie for second place in the Big 8, and was outscored by opponents by a combined total of 217 to 204. Al Onofrio was the head coach for the fourth of seven seasons. The team played its home games at Faurot Field in Columbia, Missouri.

The team's statistical leaders included Tony Galbreath with 870 rushing yards, 955 yards of total offense, and 48 points scored, Steve Pisarkiewicz with 828 passing yards, Mark Miller with 522 receiving yards, and Greg Hill with 63 points scored.

== Schedule ==
| Date | Opponent | Rank | Site | Result | Attendance | Source |
|---|---|---|---|---|---|---|
| September 14 | at Ole Miss* | No. 18 | Mississippi Veterans Memorial Stadium; Jackson, MS | L 0–10 | 38,500 | |
| September 21 | Baylor* | | Faurot Field; Columbia, MO | W 28–21 | 43,752 | |
| September 28 | No. 7 Arizona State* | | Faurot Field; Columbia, MO | W 9–0 | 59,770 | |
| October 5 | at Wisconsin* | | Camp Randall Stadium; Madison, WI | L 20–59 | 71,141 | |
| October 12 | at No. 5 Nebraska | | Memorial Stadium; Lincoln, NE (rivalry) | W 21–10 | 76,526 | |
| October 19 | at Oklahoma State | | Lewis Field; Stillwater, OK | L 7–31 | 49,300 | |
| October 26 | Colorado | | Faurot Field; Columbia, MO | W 30–24 | 61,023 | |
| November 2 | at Kansas State | | KSU Stadium; Manhattan, KS | W 52–15 | 23,000 | |
| November 9 | at No. 2 Oklahoma | | Oklahoma Memorial Stadium; Norman, OK (rivalry) | L 0–37 | 61,826 | |
| November 16 | Iowa State | | Faurot Field; Columbia, MO (rivalry) | W 10–7 | 48,642 | |
| November 23 | Kansas | | Faurot Field; Columbia, MO (Border War) | W 27–3 | 56,193 | |
*Non-conference game; Rankings from AP Poll released prior to the game
