= 1974 Kansas State Wildcats football team =

American college football season

1974 Kansas State Wildcats football
- Conference: Big Eight Conference
- Record: 4–7 (1–6 Big 8)
- Head coach: Vince Gibson (8th season)
- Home stadium: KSU Stadium

1974 Big Eight Conference football standings
	Conf.					Overall
Team	W		L		T	W		L		T
No. 1 Oklahoma $	7	–	0	–	0	11	–	0	–	0
Missouri	5	–	2	–	0	7	–	4	–	0
No. 9 Nebraska	5	–	2	–	0	9	–	3	–	0
Oklahoma State	4	–	3	–	0	7	–	5	–	0
Colorado	3	–	4	–	0	5	–	6	–	0
Iowa State	2	–	5	–	0	4	–	7	–	0
Kansas	1	–	6	–	0	4	–	7	–	0
Kansas State	1	–	6	–	0	4	–	7	–	0
$ – Conference champion; Rankings from AP Poll

The 1974 Kansas State Wildcats football team represented Kansas State University in the 1974 NCAA Division I football season. The team's head football coach was Vince Gibson, who served his eighth and final season. The Wildcats played their home games in KSU Stadium. It was the final season for Wildcat quarterback Steve Grogan.

== Schedule ==
Date	Opponent	Site	Result	Attendance	Source
September 14	Tulsa*	KSU Stadium; Manhattan, KS	W 31–14	18,000	
September 21	Wichita State*	KSU Stadium; Manhattan, KS	W 17–0	32,800	
September 28	Pacific (CA)*	KSU Stadium; Manhattan, KS	W 38–7	24,100	
October 5	at Mississippi State*	Scott Field; Starkville, MS	L 16–21	31,000	
October 12	No. 19 Kansas	KSU Stadium; Manhattan, KS (rivalry)	L 13–20	45,000	
October 19	at Iowa State	Clyde Williams Field; Ames, IA (rivalry)	L 18–23	35,000	
October 26	at No. 2 Oklahoma	Oklahoma Memorial Stadium; Norman, OK	L 0–63	61,826	
November 2	Missouri	KSU Stadium; Manhattan, KS	L 15–52	23,000	
November 9	No. 17 Oklahoma State^{†}	KSU Stadium; Manhattan, KS	L 5–29	18,000	
November 16	at No. 6 Nebraska	Memorial Stadium; Lincoln, NE (rivalry)	L 7–35	76,188	
November 23	Colorado	KSU Stadium; Manhattan, KS (rivalry)	W 33–19	12,000	
*Non-conference game; ^{†}Homecoming; Rankings from AP Poll released prior to the game

== Roster ==
1974 Kansas State Wildcats football team roster
Players			Coaches
Offense: Pos. / # / Name / Class; QB / 11 / Steve Grogan / Sr	Defense: Pos. / # / Name / Class	Special teams: Pos. / # / Name / Class	Head coach: Vince Gibson; Coordinators/assistant coaches Legend: (C) Team captain; (S) Suspended; (I) Ineligible; Injured; Redshirt
