= David Humm =

American football player (1952–2018)

No. 11, 10
- Position: Quarterback

Personal information
- Born: April 2, 1952; Las Vegas, Nevada, U.S.
- Died: March 27, 2018 (aged 65); Las Vegas, Nevada, U.S.
- Listed height: 6 ft 2 in (1.88 m)
- Listed weight: 188 lb (85 kg)

Career information
- High school: Gorman (Las Vegas)
- College: Nebraska (1972–1974)
- NFL draft: 1975: 5th round, 128th overall pick

Career history
- Oakland Raiders (1975–1979); Buffalo Bills (1980); Baltimore Colts (1981–1982); Los Angeles Raiders (1983–1984)

Awards and highlights
- 2× Super Bowl champion (XI, XVIII); National champion (1971); First-team All-American (1974); First-team All-Big Eight (1974); Second-team All-Big Eight (1972)

Career NFL statistics
- Passing attempts: 137
- Passing completions: 63
- Completion percentage: 46.0%
- TD–INT: 3–8
- Passing yards: 753
- Passer rating: 46.3
- Stats at Pro Football Reference

David Henry Humm (April 2, 1952 – March 27, 2018) was an American professional football player who played as a quarterback in the National Football League (NFL) from 1975 to 1984 for the Oakland / Los Angeles Raiders, Buffalo Bills, and Baltimore Colts. He played college football at the University of Nebraska.

== Early life ==
Born and raised in Las Vegas, Nevada, Humm attended Bishop Gorman High School, where he was an All-American prep quarterback and a heavily recruited prospect. Humm was subsequently inducted into the Southern Nevada Sports Hall of Fame in 1997.

== College career ==
Humm accepted a scholarship from the University of Nebraska, where he was a three-year starter from 1972–74 under head coaches Bob Devaney and Tom Osborne. Humm succeeded Jerry Tagge, who piloted Nebraska to back-to-back national championships in 1970 and 1971.

Although he could not win as a starter against rival Oklahoma, Humm led the Huskers to three postseason victories in the Orange, Cotton, and Sugar Bowls.

== Professional career ==
Humm was selected by the Oakland Raiders in the fifth round of the 1975 NFL draft with the 128th overall pick, partly because he was ambidextrous. The next year, he was a part of the Super Bowl XI championship team. He was the backup to Ken Stabler for five seasons and was also an effective holder for field goals or extra points. Humm had an unusual habit of going on to the field with no shoulder pads, which sometimes tipped the opposing team that a fake field goal was unlikely.

In 1981, Humm signed as a free agent with the Baltimore Colts. That year, the game between the Colts and the Dallas Cowboys was the only start in his NFL career when injuries sidelined Bert Jones and Greg Landry. He completed seven of 24 passes for 90 yards and two interceptions, in a 37–13 loss, the thirteenth consecutive for the Colts. Notably, the opposing quarterback for the Cowboys, Glenn Carano, was also making his first and only NFL start in place of Danny White. This is the only time in league history two "one and done" quarterbacks have ever faced off. Carano and Humm were the subjects of an NFL Films piece entitled My One and Only, recounting the 1981 game. The two quarterbacks had been friends since high school (both played high school football in Nevada), and remained friends until Humm's death.

In 1983, he was signed as a free agent by the Los Angeles Raiders. That season, he was a part of the Super Bowl XVIII championship team, serving as the third-string quarterback behind Jim Plunkett and Marc Wilson.

Humm was the only Raiders player to be a member of both the Raiders' 1976 Super Bowl XI and 1983 Super Bowl XVIII championship teams, without also being a member of the 1980 Super Bowl XV championship team.

Humm's last NFL action came in a Week 10 contest in 1984 against the Chicago Bears, a game considered one of the most violent in NFL history.

== Personal life ==
After his playing career, Humm served as an analyst for Mutual Broadcasting System, the Las Vegas Posse, and the Oakland Raiders.

In 1988, Humm was diagnosed with multiple sclerosis at age 36 and lost the use of his legs in 1997. He had set up a broadcasting studio in his home and worked as a color commentator for the Oakland Raiders. Humm died due to complications from multiple sclerosis on March 27, 2018.
