= 1974 Nebraska Cornhuskers football team =

American college football season

1974 Nebraska Cornhuskers football

Sugar Bowl champion

Sugar Bowl, W 13–10 vs. Florida
- Conference: Big Eight Conference

Ranking
- Coaches: No. 8
- AP: No. 9
- Record: 9–3 (5–2 Big 8)
- Head coach: Tom Osborne (2nd season)
- Offensive scheme: I formation
- Defensive coordinator: Monte Kiffin (6th season)
- Base defense: 5–2
- Home stadium: Memorial Stadium

1974 Big Eight Conference football standings
	Conf.					Overall
Team	W		L		T	W		L		T
No. 1 Oklahoma $	7	–	0	–	0	11	–	0	–	0
Missouri	5	–	2	–	0	7	–	4	–	0
No. 9 Nebraska	5	–	2	–	0	9	–	3	–	0
Oklahoma State	4	–	3	–	0	7	–	5	–	0
Colorado	3	–	4	–	0	5	–	6	–	0
Iowa State	2	–	5	–	0	4	–	7	–	0
Kansas	1	–	6	–	0	4	–	7	–	0
Kansas State	1	–	6	–	0	4	–	7	–	0
$ – Conference champion; Rankings from AP Poll

The 1974 Nebraska Cornhuskers football team represented the University of Nebraska–Lincoln in the 1974 NCAA Division I football season. The team was coached by Tom Osborne and played their home games in Memorial Stadium in Lincoln, Nebraska.

== Schedule ==
Date	Time	Opponent	Rank	Site	TV	Result	Attendance	Source
September 14	1:30 pm	Oregon*	No. 7	Memorial Stadium; Lincoln, NE		W 61–7	76,053	
September 21	12:50 pm	at Wisconsin*	No. 4	Camp Randall Stadium; Madison, WI (rivalry)	ABC	L 20–21	73,381	
September 28	1:30 pm	Northwestern*	No. 10	Memorial Stadium; Lincoln, NE		W 49–7	76,101	
October 5	1:30 pm	Minnesota*	No. 6	Memorial Stadium; Lincoln, NE (rivalry)		W 54–0	76,408	
October 12	1:30 pm	Missouri	No. 5	Memorial Stadium; Lincoln, NE (rivalry)		L 10–21	76,526	
October 19	1:30 pm	at No. 13 Kansas	No. 12	Memorial Stadium; Lawrence, KS (rivalry)		W 56–0	52,300	
October 26	1:30 pm	Oklahoma State^{†}	No. 9	Memorial Stadium; Lincoln, NE		W 7–3	76,476	
November 2	1:00 pm	at Colorado	No. 9	Folsom Field; Boulder, CO (rivalry)	ABC	W 31–15	52,049	
November 9	1:30 pm	at Iowa State	No. 9	Clyde Williams Field; Ames, IA (rivalry)		W 23–13	37,000	
November 16	1:30 pm	Kansas State	No. 6	Memorial Stadium; Lincoln, NE (rivalry)		W 35–7	76,188	
November 23	1:30 pm	No. 1 Oklahoma	No. 6	Memorial Stadium; Lincoln, NE (rivalry)		L 14–28	76,636	
December 31	7:00 pm	vs. No. 18 Florida*	No. 8	Tulane Stadium; New Orleans, LA (Sugar Bowl)	ABC	W 13–10	67,890	
*Non-conference game; ^{†}Homecoming; Rankings from AP Poll released prior to the game; All times are in Central time

== Roster ==
Alward, Tom #63 (Sr.) G Anthony, Monte #49 (So.) IB; Bahe, Ritch #24 (Sr.) WB; Belka, Jim #47 (So.) FB; Block, King (So.) LB; Bonness, Rik #54 (Jr.) C Borg, Tim #19 (So.) DB; Brock, Dan #94 (So.) DT; Bunkers, Bill (So.) DB; Burns, Burton #49 (So.) FB; Burns, Ed #17 (So.) QB; Burrow, Jim #2 (Jr.) DB; Butterfield, Dave #34 (So.) DB; Cabell, Jake #13 (Jr.) DB; Carpenter, Jeff #37 (So.) LB; Clark, Dennis (So.) DT; Clark, Mike (So.) OT; Coccia, Tom #90 (Jr.) DE; Collura, Joe #7 (So.) MG; Costanzo, Rich #77 (Jr.) OT; Coyle, Mike #42 (Jr.) PK; Crenshaw, Marvin #73 (Sr.) OT; Davis, Tom #52 (So.) C Davis, Tony #25 (Jr.) FB; Dervin, Joe (So.) LB; Doak, Mark #71 (Sr.) OT; Duda, Rich #50 (Sr.) C Eichelberger, Percy #44 (So.) LB; Eveland, Al #43 (So.) PK; Everett, Earl #9 (So.) QB; Folsom, Bob (So.) WB; Fultz, Mike #72 (So.) DT; Garcia, Randy #15 (So.) QB; Gast, Reg (So.) DE; Gillespie, Dave #28 (So.) IB; Gissler, Dean #97 (Jr.) DT; Hanchera, Gary #5 (So.) PK; Hayes, Bob #76 (So.) OT; Hegener, Stan #64 (Sr.) G Heiser, Tom #27 (Jr.) WB	Hertenstein, Scott #98 (So.) DT; Heydorff, Mark #22 (Sr.) DB; Higgs, Gary #46 (So.) FB; Hoins, Steve #78 (So.) OT; Homola, Ken (So.) TE; Houser, Mike (So.) PK; Humm, Dave #12 (Sr.) QB; Hunter, Ken #78 (Jr.) MG; Jenkins, Brad #92 (So.) TE; Johnson, Ardell #29 (Sr.) DB; Jones, Chuck #35 (Jr.) DB; Jorgensen, Greg (So.) OG; Justice, Jason #38 (So.) FB; Kucera, Lindsay #41 (So.) FB; Kyros, George #18 (Sr.) DB; Lackovic, Tim #80 (Sr.) SE; Lee, John #69 (Jr.) MG; Leonardi, Chad #61 (Sr.) OG; Lessman, Randy #39 (So.) DE; Lingenfelter, Bob #70 (So.) OT; Lloyd, Jerry (So.) DT; Luck, Terry #11 (Jr.) QB; Malito, Chuck #89 (So.) SE; Markley, Paul (So.) DB; Markus, Steve #36 (So.) OG; Martin, Bob #87 (Jr.) DE; Mazon, Frank #31 (Jr.) DB; McGuire, Tim #55 (Jr.) OG; McWhorter, Mike (So.) WB; Miller, Dan #58 (So.) OG; Mills, George #75 (Jr.) DT; Monds, Wonder #26 (Jr.) DB; Moran, Jeff #30 (Sr.) IB; Mushinskie, Larry #88 (Jr.) TE; Nelson, Bob #57 (Sr.) LB; Nitzel, Ron #81 (Jr.) SE; Offner, Mike #95 (Jr.) DE; O'Leary, John #14 (Jr.) IB; Panneton, Rick (Jr.) TE; Pate, Tom #68 (Sr.) DE; Pavelka, Dennis #74 (Sr.) OT	Peterson, Matt #82 (Jr.) TE; Phillips, Ray #96 (Jr.) DE; Pillen, Clete #33 (So.) LB; Plucknett, John (So.) DT; Pruitt, Ron #91 (Jr.) DT; Pullen, Jeff #67 (So.) MG; Ray, Glen #10 (So.) QB; Redding, Dave #84 (Jr.) DE; Reilly, Tim #56 (Jr.) OG; Rogers, Terry #40 (Sr.) DB; Ruud, Tom #45 (Sr.) LB; Samuel, Tony #99 (So.) DE; Schmidt, Dan #51 (So.) OG; Schneider, Jeff #1 (Jr.) DB; Seeton, Jim #16 (Jr.) DB; Senkbeil, Rocky (So.) DB; Shamblin, Dave #85 (Jr.) SE; Smith, Kent #23 (So.) DB; Spaeth, Ken #86 (So.) TE; Stacey, Kurt #3 (So.) DB; Starkebaum, John #48 (Sr.) LB; Stovall, Rod (So.) DB; Stuberg, Wayne #59 (So.) C Talley, Chester #32 (So.) IB; Tangeman, Steve (So.) TE; Thomas, Bobby #8 (So.) WB; Thomas, Tom #53 (Jr.) C Thornton, Willie #65 (Jr.) MG; Valasek, Larry #4 (So.) DB; Varner, Rich #6 (So.) C Waldemore, Stan #62 (So.) DT; Westbrook, Don #21 (Sr.) WB; Wied, Jerry #93 (Jr.) DT; Wieser, Steve #83 (Sr.) DE; Wightman, Jim (So.) DE; Yaralian, Zaven (Sr.) DB; Zabrocki, Dale (So.) WB; Zanetich, Nick #66 (So.) OG

=== Depth chart ===
Defense

FS
George Kyros
Mike Heydorff
Larry Valasek

INSDIE	INSDIE
Tom Ruud	John Starkebaum; Bob Nelson
Precy Eichelberger	Cletus Pillen
Joe Dervin	Randy Lessman

MONSTER BACK
Wonder Monds
Jim Seeton
Terry Rogers

CB
Adrell Johnson
Jim Burrow
Kent Smith

DE	DT	NT	DT	DE
Tom Pate	Ron Pruitt	John Lee	Mike Fultz	Bob Martin
Dave Redding	Jerry Wied	Willie Thornton	Dan Brock	Steve Weiser
.Ray Phillips	Dean Gissler	Jeff Pullen	John Plucknett	Tony Samuel

CB
Dave Butterfield
Chuck Jones
Kurt Stacey

Offense

SE
Chuck Malito
Bobby Thomas
Ron Nitzel

LT	LG	C	RG	RT
Mark Doak	Tom Alward	Rik Bonness	Sten Hagener	Marvin Crenshaw
Dennis Pavelka	Dan Schmidt	Rich Duda	Nick Zanetich	Steve Hoins
Bob Lingenfelter	Steve Markus	Wayne Stuberg	Tim McGuire	Rich Costanzo

TE
Larry Mushinskie
Brad Jenkins
Ken Spaeth

WB
Don Westbrook
Ritch Bahe
Tom Heiser

QB
Dave Humm
Terry Luck
Earl Everett

FB
Tony Davis
Gary Higgs
Jim Belka

Special teams

RB
Monte Anthony
John O'Leary
Dave Gillespie
Jeff Moran

== Coaching staff ==
Name	Title	First year in this position	Years at Nebraska	Alma mater
Tom Osborne	Head coach Offensive coordinator	1973	1964–1997	Hastings College
Monte Kiffin	Defensive coordinator	1973	1967–1976	Nebraska
Cletus Fischer	Offensive line		1960–1985	Nebraska
Jim Ross			1962–1976	
John Melton	Tight ends Wingbacks	1973	1962–1988	Wyoming
Mike Corgan	Running backs	1962	1962–1982	Notre Dame
Warren Powers	Defensive backs		1969–1976	Nebraska
Boyd Epley	Head strength coach	1969	1969–2003	Nebraska
Bill Myles	Offensive line	1972	1972–1976	Drake University
Jerry Moore	Wide receivers	1973	1973–1978	Baylor
George Darlington			1973–2002	Rutgers
Rick Duval	Linebackers; Recruiting coordinator	1973	1973–1974	Worcester
Milt Tenopir	Offensive line	1974	1974–2002	Sterling

== Game summaries ==
=== Oregon ===
Oregon at #7 Nebraska [box score]

Team	1	2	3	4	Total
Oregon	0	0	0	7	7
• #7 Nebraska	23	10	14	14	61

- Date: 1974-09-14
- Location: Memorial Stadium, Lincoln, Nebraska
- Game attendance: 76,053

Oregon's only score came in the 4th quarter against Nebraska reserves, as the Cornhuskers entirely demolished the Ducks in Lincoln to open the season 1–0.

=== Wisconsin ===
#4 Nebraska at Wisconsin [box score]

Team	1	2	3	4	Total
#4 Nebraska	7	7	3	3	20
• Wisconsin	0	7	0	14	21

- Date: 1974-09-21
- Location: Camp Randall Stadium, Madison, Wisconsin
- Game attendance: 73,381

Wisconsin's air attack provided the Badgers with a 242–47 passing margin, while Nebraska's ground attack rolled up a 258–77 yard advantage on the ground, and the Cornhuskers led Wisconsin for all but six minutes of the game and were still in front by 6 when the Badgers pulled out a 77-yard touchdown pass and successful PAT with 3:29 in the 4th to pull ahead by 1 point, sending the Cornhuskers home with an early-season loss.

=== Northwestern ===
Northwestern at #10 Nebraska [box score]

Team	1	2	3	4	Total
Northwestern	0	0	0	7	7
• #10 Nebraska	14	21	7	7	49

- Date: 1974-09-28
- Location: Memorial Stadium, Lincoln, Nebraska
- Game attendance: 76,101

Nebraska RB Monte Anthony set a new freshman record with his 111 yards on 14 carries as Nebraska rolled up 563 total offensive yards on the way to exacting some revenge on the Big Ten Conference following the previous week's loss to Wisconsin.

=== Minnesota ===
Minnesota at #6 Nebraska [box score]

Team	1	2	3	4	Total
Minnesota	0	0	0	0	0
• #6 Nebraska	6	20	15	13	54

- Date: 1974-10-05
- Location: Memorial Stadium, Lincoln, Nebraska
- Game attendance: 76,408

Nebraska's wrath toward the Big 10 was not completed yet, as the Cornhuskers steamrolled Minnesota 54–0 in a dominating defeat of the Golden Gophers.

=== Missouri ===
Missouri at #5 Nebraska [box score]

Team	1	2	3	4	Total
• Missouri	0	0	0	21	21
#5 Nebraska	0	3	0	7	10

- Date: 1974-10-12
- Location: Memorial Stadium, Lincoln, Nebraska
- Game attendance: 76,526

Missouri, while unable to come up with any points of their own early on, still managed to hold Nebraska to a 10–0 lead well into the 4th quarter before suddenly coming to life and putting up 21 unanswered points in a stunning upset that left Nebraska winless at the outset of their conference schedule.

=== Kansas ===
#12 Nebraska at #13 Kansas [box score]

Team	1	2	3	4	Total
• #12 Nebraska	0	14	14	28	56
#13 Kansas	0	0	0	0	0

- Date: 1974-10-19
- Location: Memorial Stadium, Lawrence, Kansas
- Game attendance: 52,300

For the second time this season, #12 Nebraska came off of a loss, beating #13 Kansas in a 56–0 rout at Lawrence. Nebraska QB Dave Humm set a new Nebraska and Big 8 completion percentage record, a new team and conference season touchdowns record, and a new team/conference/national record of 15 consecutive pass completions, going 23 of 27 with no interceptions for the day, an especially remarkable event considering that the Cornhusker offense was known for its land-based attack. More than half of the sellout crowd were Nebraska fans who made the short drive south.

=== Oklahoma State ===
Oklahoma State at #9 Nebraska [box score]

Team	1	2	3	4	Total
Oklahoma State	0	0	0	3	3
• #9 Nebraska	0	0	7	0	7

- Date: 1974-10-26
- Location: Memorial Stadium, Lincoln, Nebraska
- Game attendance: 76,426

Oklahoma State outrushed Nebraska 204–167 but was able to produce only a 4th-quarter field goal, as Nebraska was also stymied offensively yet was able to survive the game by riding a single 3rd-quarter touchdown for the win. The Blackshirts saved the day, recovering a Cowboy fumble, reeling in an interception, and blocking a field goal attempt to help preserve the win.

=== Colorado ===
#9 Nebraska at Colorado [box score]

Team	1	2	3	4	Total
• #9 Nebraska	6	11	14	0	31
Colorado	0	0	0	15	15

- Date: 1974-11-02
- Location: Folsom Field, Boulder, Colorado
- Game attendance: 52,949

Looking at the statistics might suggest this game was close, but Nebraska was comfortably leading 31–0 in the 4th when Cornhusker reserves took over and allowed Colorado to put up some numbers of their own to make it not look so bad. Despite nearly matched final offensive yardage and first down totals, the Buffaloes were unable to overcome a painful 1–5 turnover deficit.

=== Iowa State ===
#9 Nebraska at Iowa State [box score]

Team	1	2	3	4	Total
• #9 Nebraska	7	3	13	0	23
Iowa State	0	0	0	13	13

- Date: 1974-11-09
- Location: Clyde Williams Field, Ames, Iowa
- Game attendance: 37,000

The story of the previous game repeated itself, as Nebraska was out in front with an adequate lead when Cornhusker reserves entered the game to mop things up, which allowed Iowa State to put up 13 points for their game total, merely tying Nebraska's 3rd quarter output.

=== Kansas State ===
Kansas State at #6 Nebraska [box score]

Team	1	2	3	4	Total
Kansas State	0	0	0	7	7
• #6 Nebraska	7	7	14	7	35

- Date: 1974-11-16
- Location: Memorial Stadium, Lincoln, Nebraska
- Game attendance: 76,188

For the 8th straight game, the Blackshirts held their opponent scoreless for 3 of 4 quarters in a game, as Nebraska easily defeated Kansas State in Lincoln.

=== Oklahoma ===
#1 Oklahoma at #6 Nebraska [box score]

Team	1	2	3	4	Total
• #1 Oklahoma	0	7	7	14	28
#6 Nebraska	0	7	7	0	14

- Date: 1974-11-23
- Location: Memorial Stadium, Lincoln, Nebraska
- Game attendance: 76,636

Nebraska had a chance to run with the momentum, after breaking a 7–7 halftime tie open a few minutes into the 3rd quarter and then recovering Oklahoma's fumble on the following kickoff, but the opportunity was wasted when the Cornhuskers could not convert the gift into points, and the game belonged to the Sooners from there on out as Oklahoma put up 21 unanswered points to take back the lead and win.

Unlike the previous three meetings, which were televised nationally to a Thanksgiving Day audience by ABC, this game could not air due to Oklahoma's NCAA probation, which banned the Sooners from television for the 1974 and 1975 regular seasons.

=== Florida ===
#18 Florida vs #8 Nebraska [box score]

Team	1	2	3	4	Total
#18 Florida	7	3	0	0	10
• #8 Nebraska	0	0	0	13	13

- Date: 1974-12-31
- Location: Tulane Stadium, New Orleans, Louisiana
- Game start: 6:35 p.m. CST
- Game attendance: 67,850
- TV announcers (ABC): Keith Jackson and Barry Switzer

Florida drew first blood, scoring a relatively early touchdown, and followed it up with a 2nd-quarter field goal to send Nebraska into the locker room at half time down 0–10. As the third quarter drew to a close, Nebraska successfully held off the Gators in a goal line stand and then marched 99 yards to close the gap with Florida 7–10 at the start of the 4th, and was able to follow those points with two more field goals to pull ahead by 3, while Florida was unable to respond in kind to the comeback, giving up the game to Nebraska.

== Rankings ==
Ranking movements Legend: ██ Increase in ranking ██ Decrease in ranking
	Week														
Poll	Pre	1	2	3	4	5	6	7	8	9	10	11	12	13	Final
AP	7	7	4	10	6	5	12	9	9	9	6	6	9	8	9
Coaches															8

=== Awards ===
Award	Name(s)
All-America 1st team	Rik Bonness, Marvin Crewnshaw, Dave Humm
All-America 3rd team	Tom Alward
All-America honorable mention	Bob Martin, Ron Pruitt
All-Big 8 1st team	Rik Bonness, Marvin Crewnshaw, Dave Humm, Bob Martin, Tom Ruud
All-Big 8 2nd team	Tom Alward, Wonder Monds, Bob Nelson, Don Westbrook
Big 8 Freshman Player of the Year	Monte Anthony
Big 8 Defensive Sophomore of the Year	Mike Fultz

=== NFL and Pro Players ===
The following Nebraska players who participated in the 1974 season later moved on to the next level and joined a professional or semi-pro team as draftees or free agents.

Name	Team
Tom Alward	Birmingham Vulcans
Monte Anthony	Baltimore Colts
Rik Bonness	Oakland Raiders
Ed Burns	New Orleans Saints
Jim Burrow	Green Bay Packers
Tom Davis	Toronto Argonauts
Tony Davis	Cincinnati Bengals
Mark Doak	Birmingham Vulcans
Mike Fultz	New Orleans Saints
Dave Humm	Oakland Raiders
John Lee	San Diego Chargers
Bob Lingenfelter	Cleveland Browns
Terry Luck	Cleveland Browns
Bob Martin	New York Jets
Wonder Monds	Ottawa Rough Riders
Bob Nelson	Buffalo Bills
John O'Leary	Montreal Alouettes
Tom Pate	Hamilton Tiger-Cats
Ray Phillips	Cincinnati Bengals
Tom Ruud	Buffalo Bills
John Starkebaum	New Orleans Saints
Stan Waldemore	New York Jets
Don Westbrook	New England Patriots
