= 1974 Gator Bowl =

American college football game

- 30th Gator Bowl
Texas Longhorns	Auburn Tigers
(8–3)	(9–2)
SWC	SEC
3	27
Head coach: Darrell Royal	Head coach: Ralph Jordan
AP / Coaches; 11 / 10	AP / Coaches; 6 / 5
	1	2	3	4	Total
Texas	3	0	0	0	3
Auburn	14	2	0	11	27
- Date: December 30, 1974
- Season: 1974
- Stadium: Gator Bowl Stadium
- Location: Jacksonville, Florida
- MVP: QB Phil Gargis (Auburn); RB Earl Campbell (Texas)
- Referee: R. Pete Williams (SEC; split crew: SEC, SWC)
- Attendance: 63,811

United States TV coverage
- Network: ABC
- Announcers: Chris Schenkel and Frank Broyles

The 1974 Gator Bowl was a college football bowl game that featured the Texas Longhorns and the Auburn Tigers.

== Background ==
The Longhorns tied for second in the Southwest Conference, with a 3–2 start followed by with five victories in their final six games of the regular season, including a victory over #9 Texas A&M. Auburn started 7–0 on the season, reaching as high as #5 in the polls, before a loss to #11 Florida. A loss to #2 Alabama three weeks later sealed their fate in second place in the Southeastern Conference (SEC) alongside Georgia. This was the seventh straight bowl appearance for both the Tigers and the Longhorns. This was the first appearance in the Gator Bowl for the Longhorns, and Auburn's third Gator Bowl of the decade.

== Game summary ==
After Texas punted the ball to the Auburn 40 after failing to advance the ball from their own 4 after the opening kickoff. Auburn promptly drove the ball 60 yards, culminated by a 7-yard pass from Phil Gargis to Ed Butler. After the Longhorns fumbled the ball at their own 27, the Tigers scored two plays later, on a Mitzi Jackson touchdown plunge, nine minutes into the game. The Longhorns drove from their 23 to the Auburn 18, before they settled for a Billy Scott field goal from 35 yards out. In the second quarter, Jim McKinney blocked a Longhorn punt that fell into the end zone for a safety, making it 16–3 at halftime. In the fourth quarter, a Mike Fuller interception gave the Tigers the ball at the Longhorn 29. A few plays later, Butler caught another touchdown pass from Gargis (with Nugent catching the conversion pass) to make it 24–3. With nine seconds remaining, the Tigers added in their final points on a Chris Wilson 28-yard field goal. Phil Gargis went 6-of-11 for 60 yards and 2 interceptions and 2 touchdowns, with 14 carries for 51 yards, in a co-MVP effort. Earl Campbell went for 91 yards on 23 carries for the Longhorns in an co-MVP effort.

== Aftermath ==
Jordan retired the following season. The Tigers did not return to a bowl until 1982. Neither has returned to the Gator Bowl since this game.

== Statistics ==
Statistics	Texas	Auburn
First downs	14	19
Rushing yards	203	256
Passing yards	98	70
Total offense	301	326
Passing (C–A–I)	10–21–3	7–13–2
Punts–average	4–28.8	2–45.5
Fumbles–lost	5–4	7–5
Penalties–yards	5–37	6–70
Time of possession	28:06	31:54
