= 1974 Texas Longhorns football team =

American college football season

1974 Texas Longhorns football

Gator Bowl, L 3–27 vs. Auburn
- Conference: Southwest Conference

Ranking
- AP: No. 17
- Record: 8–4 (5–2 SWC)
- Head coach: Darrell Royal (18th season)
- Offensive coordinator: Fred Akers
- Defensive coordinator: Mike Campbell
- Home stadium: Memorial Stadium

1974 Southwest Conference football standings
	Conf.					Overall
Team	W		L		T	W		L		T
No. 14 Baylor $	6	–	1	–	0	8	–	4	–	0
No. 17 Texas	5	–	2	–	0	8	–	4	–	0
No. 16 Texas A&M	5	–	2	–	0	8	–	3	–	0
Arkansas	3	–	3	–	1	6	–	4	–	1
SMU	3	–	3	–	1	6	–	4	–	1
Texas Tech	3	–	4	–	0	6	–	4	–	2
Rice	2	–	5	–	0	2	–	8	–	1
TCU	0	–	7	–	0	1	–	10	–	0
$ – Conference champion; Rankings from AP Poll

The 1974 Texas Longhorns football team represented the University of Texas at Austin in the 1974 NCAA Division I football season. The Longhorns finished the regular season with an 8–3 record and lost to Auburn in the 1974 Gator Bowl. This was the first season where Texas, alongside Ohio State, Army, and Notre Dame, played an 11-game regular season schedule. Many schools had been playing 11 games since it was first permitted by the NCAA in 1970 (Rice was the only Southwest Conference team besides Texas to not play 11 games in 1970, but the Owls added the extra game the next season). .

== Schedule ==
Date	Time	Opponent	Rank	Site	TV	Result	Attendance	Source
September 14	6:30 p.m.	at Boston College*	No. 10	Alumni Stadium; Chestnut Hill, MA		W 42–19	32,227	
September 21	7:00 p.m.	Wyoming*	No. 9	Memorial Stadium; Austin, TX		W 34–7	52,800	
September 28	1:00 p.m.	at Texas Tech	No. 6	Jones Stadium; Lubbock, TX (rivalry)	ABC	L 3–26	51,082	
October 5	7:00 p.m.	Washington*	No. 19	Memorial Stadium; Austin, TX		W 35–21	50,250	
October 12	2:00 p.m.	vs. No. 2 Oklahoma*	No. 17	Cotton Bowl; Dallas, TX (Red River Shootout)		L 13–16	72,032	
October 19	2:00 p.m.	Arkansas	No. 16	Memorial Stadium; Austin, TX (rivalry)	ABC	W 38–7	66,700	
October 26	7:30 p.m.	at Rice	No. 13	Rice Stadium; Houston, TX (rivalry)		W 27–6	56,500	
November 2	2:00 p.m.	SMU	No. 12	Memorial Stadium; Austin, TX		W 35–15	58,500	
November 9	2:00 p.m.	at Baylor	No. 12	Baylor Stadium; Waco, TX (rivalry)		L 24–34	48,300	
November 16	2:00 p.m.	at TCU		Amon G. Carter Stadium; Fort Worth, TX (rivalry)		W 81–16	30,000	
November 29	12:00 p.m.	No. 8 Texas A&M	No. 17	Memorial Stadium; Austin, TX (rivalry)	ABC	W 32–3	77,584	
December 30	7:00 p.m.	vs. No. 6 Auburn*	No. 11	Gator Bowl; Jacksonville, FL (Gator Bowl)	ABC	L 3–27	63,811	
*Non-conference game; Rankings from AP Poll released prior to the game; All times are in Central time
