= 1974 Arkansas Razorbacks football team =

American college football season

1974 Arkansas Razorbacks football
- Conference: Southwest Conference
- Record: 6–4–1 (3–3–1 SWC)
- Head coach: Frank Broyles (17th season)
- Captains: Billy Burns; Rollen Smith
- Home stadium: Razorback Stadium; War Memorial Stadium

1974 Southwest Conference football standings
	Conf.					Overall
Team	W		L		T	W		L		T
No. 14 Baylor $	6	–	1	–	0	8	–	4	–	0
No. 17 Texas	5	–	2	–	0	8	–	4	–	0
No. 16 Texas A&M	5	–	2	–	0	8	–	3	–	0
Arkansas	3	–	3	–	1	6	–	4	–	1
SMU	3	–	3	–	1	6	–	4	–	1
Texas Tech	3	–	4	–	0	6	–	4	–	2
Rice	2	–	5	–	0	2	–	8	–	1
TCU	0	–	7	–	0	1	–	10	–	0
$ – Conference champion; Rankings from AP Poll

The 1974 Arkansas Razorbacks football team represented the University of Arkansas in the Southwest Conference (SWC) during the 1974 NCAA Division I football season. In their 17th year under head coach Frank Broyles, the Razorbacks compiled a 6–4–1 record (3–3–1 against SWC opponents), finished in a tie for fourth place in the SWC, and outscored their opponents by a combined total of 285 to 164.

== Schedule ==
Date	Opponent	Rank	Site	TV	Result	Attendance	Source
September 14	No. 5 USC*	No. 20	War Memorial Stadium; Little Rock, AR		W 22–7	54,622	
September 21	Oklahoma State*	No. 10	War Memorial Stadium; Little Rock, AR		L 7–26	54,535	
September 28	Tulsa*		Razorback Stadium; Fayetteville, AR		W 60–0	39,200	
October 5	at TCU	No. 20	Amon G. Carter Stadium; Fort Worth, TX		W 49–0	30,210	
October 12	Baylor	No. 14	Razorback Stadium; Fayetteville, AR		L 17–21	43,300	
October 19	at No. 16 Texas		Memorial Stadium; Austin, TX (rivalry)	ABC	L 7–38	66,700	
October 26	Colorado State*		War Memorial Stadium; Little Rock, AR		W 43–9	44,852	
November 2	at No. 8 Texas A&M		Kyle Field; College Station, TX (rivalry)	ABC	L 13–20	47,887	
November 9	Rice		Razorback Stadium; Fayetteville, AR		W 25–6	38,000	
November 16	SMU		War Memorial Stadium; Little Rock, AR		T 24–24	46,300	
November 23	at Texas Tech		Jones Stadium; Lubbock, TX (rivalry)		W 21–13	38,327	
*Non-conference game; Rankings from AP Poll released prior to the game

== Roster ==
- QB Mike Kirkland, Jr.
