= 1974 Baylor Bears football team =

American college football season

1974 Baylor Bears football

SWC champion

Cotton Bowl Classic, L 21–40 vs. Penn State
- Conference: Southwest Conference

Ranking
- Coaches: No. 14
- AP: No. 14
- Record: 8–4 (6–1 SWC)
- Head coach: Grant Teaff (3rd season)
- Offensive coordinator: Bill Yung (1st season)
- Home stadium: Baylor Stadium

1974 Southwest Conference football standings
	Conf.					Overall
Team	W		L		T	W		L		T
No. 14 Baylor $	6	–	1	–	0	8	–	4	–	0
No. 17 Texas	5	–	2	–	0	8	–	4	–	0
No. 16 Texas A&M	5	–	2	–	0	8	–	3	–	0
Arkansas	3	–	3	–	1	6	–	4	–	1
SMU	3	–	3	–	1	6	–	4	–	1
Texas Tech	3	–	4	–	0	6	–	4	–	2
Rice	2	–	5	–	0	2	–	8	–	1
TCU	0	–	7	–	0	1	–	10	–	0
$ – Conference champion; Rankings from AP Poll

The 1974 Baylor Bears football team represented the Baylor University in the 1974 NCAA Division I football season. Baylor won eight games and captured the Southwest Conference (SWC) championship for the first time since 1924, and in the process defeated the Texas by a score of 34–24 after rallying from a 24–7 halftime deficit. It was Baylor's first victory over the Longhorns in 17 years. The 1974 season and the win over Texas are commonly referred to as the "Miracle on the Brazos" (after the Brazos River, which runs near the Baylor campus) and it remains part of Baylor lore.

== Schedule ==
Date	Opponent	Rank	Site	Result	Attendance	Source
September 14	at No. 1 Oklahoma*		Oklahoma Memorial Stadium; Norman, OK	L 11–28	62,375	
September 21	at Missouri*		Faurot Field; Columbia, MO	L 21–28	43,752	
September 28	No. 12 Oklahoma State*		Baylor Stadium; Waco, TX	W 31–14	30,000	
October 5	at Florida State*		Doak Campbell Stadium; Tallahassee, FL	W 21–17	25,262	
October 12	at No. 14 Arkansas		Razorback Stadium; Fayetteville, AR	W 21–17	43,300	
October 26	No. 8 Texas A&M^{†}		Baylor Stadium; Waco, TX (rivalry)	L 0–20	48,500–51,200	
November 2	at TCU		Amon G. Carter Stadium; Fort Worth, TX (rivalry)	W 21–7	18,792	
November 9	No. 12 Texas		Baylor Stadium; Waco, TX (rivalry)	W 34–24	43,100	
November 16	No. 20 Texas Tech		Baylor Stadium; Waco, TX (rivalry)	W 17–10	32,000	
November 23	at SMU	No. 16	Cotton Bowl; Dallas, TX	W 31–14	40,168	
November 30	Rice	No. 16	Baylor Stadium; Waco, TX	W 24–3	40,500	
January 1	vs. No. 7 Penn State*	No. 12	Cotton Bowl; Dallas, TX (Cotton Bowl Classic)	L 20–41	67,500–68,500	
*Non-conference game; ^{†}Homecoming; Rankings from AP Poll released prior to the game

== Team players drafted into the NFL ==
The following players were drafted into professional football following the season.

Player	Position	Round	Pick	Franchise
Neal Jeffrey	quarterback	17	423	San Diego Chargers

== Awards and honors ==
- Grant Teaff, AFCA Coach of the Year
