= 1974 SMU Mustangs football team =

American college football season

1974 SMU Mustangs football
- Conference: Southwest Conference
- Record: 6–4–1 (3–3–1 SWC)
- Head coach: Dave Smith (2nd season)
- Home stadium: Cotton Bowl

1974 Southwest Conference football standings
	Conf.					Overall
Team	W		L		T	W		L		T
No. 14 Baylor $	6	–	1	–	0	8	–	4	–	0
No. 17 Texas	5	–	2	–	0	8	–	4	–	0
No. 16 Texas A&M	5	–	2	–	0	8	–	3	–	0
Arkansas	3	–	3	–	1	6	–	4	–	1
SMU	3	–	3	–	1	6	–	4	–	1
Texas Tech	3	–	4	–	0	6	–	4	–	2
Rice	2	–	5	–	0	2	–	8	–	1
TCU	0	–	7	–	0	1	–	10	–	0
$ – Conference champion; Rankings from AP Poll

The 1974 SMU Mustangs football team represented Southern Methodist University (SMU) as a member of the Southwest Conference (SWC) during the 1974 NCAA Division I football season. Led by second-year head coach Dave Smith, the Mustangs compiled an overall record of 6–4–1 with a mark of 3–3–1 in conference play, tying for fourth place in the SWC.

== Schedule ==
Date	Opponent	Site	Result	Attendance	Source
September 14	vs. North Texas State*	Texas Stadium; Irving, TX (rivalry)	W 7–6	27,183	
September 21	Virginia Tech*	Cotton Bowl; Dallas, TX	W 28–25	13,767	
September 28	at No. 1 Ohio State*	Ohio Stadium; Columbus, OH	L 9–28	87,487	
October 5	Oregon State*	Cotton Bowl; Dallas, TX	W 37–30	16,958	
October 12	at TCU	Amon G. Carter Stadium; Fort Worth, TX (rivalry)	W 33–13	16,492	
October 19	Rice	Cotton Bowl; Dallas, TX (rivalry)	W 19–14	16,184	
October 26	No. 11 Texas Tech	Cotton Bowl; Dallas, TX	L 17–20	32,505	
November 2	at No. 12 Texas	Memorial Stadium; Austin, TX	L 15–35	58,500	
November 9	No. 5 Texas A&M	Cotton Bowl; Dallas, TX	W 18–14	44,463	
November 16	at Arkansas	War Memorial Stadium; Little Rock, AR	T 24–24	46,300	
November 23	Baylor	Cotton Bowl; Dallas, TX	L 14–31	40,168	
*Non-conference game; Rankings from AP Poll released prior to the game

== Roster ==
1974 SMU Mustangs football team roster
Players
Coaches
Offense

Pos.	#	Name	Class
RB	32	Brian Duncan	Sr
WR	15	Kenny Harrison	Jr
WR	80	Freeman Johns	Jr
RB	25	Wayne Morris	Jr
TE	88	Oscar Roan	Sr
G	65	Henry Sheppard	Jr
QB	12	Ricky Wesson	So

Defense

Pos.	#	Name	Class
DT	72	Louie Kelcher	Sr
LB	59	Ted Thompson	Sr
S	40	Arthur Whittington	Fr

Special teams

Pos.	#	Name	Class

Head coach

- Dave Smith

Coordinators/assistant coaches

Legend

- (C) Team captain
- (S) Suspended
- (I) Ineligible
- Injured
- Redshirt
