= Calvin Miller (gridiron football) =

American football player (born 1953)

No. 76, 63, 77, 67
- Position: Defensive lineman

Personal information
- Born: August 31, 1953 (age 73); Gulfport, Mississippi, U.S.
- Listed height: 6 ft 2 in (1.88 m)
- Listed weight: 260 lb (118 kg)

Career information
- High school: Gulfport
- College: Oklahoma State
- NFL draft: 1975: undrafted

Career history
- Birmingham Vulcans (1975); Saskatchewan Roughriders (1976)*; Winnipeg Blue Bombers (1976); Edmonton Eskimos (1976); New York Giants (1979); Atlanta Falcons (1980)
- * Offseason or practice squad member only
- Stats at Pro Football Reference

Calvin Miller (born August 31, 1953) is an American former professional football defensive lineman who played in the National Football League (NFL) with the New York Giants and Atlanta Falcons. He played college football for the Oklahoma State Cowboys.

== Early life ==
Calvin Miller was born on August 31, 1953, in Gulfport, Mississippi. He attended Gulfport High School.

== College career ==
Miller played junior college football at Mississippi Gulf Coast Community College from 1971 to 1972, garnering junior college All-American recognition. He transferred to Oklahoma State University, where he was a two-year letterman for the Cowboys from 1973 to 1974. He earned Big Eight Conference lineman of the week honors twice at Oklahoma State.

== Professional career ==
After going undrafted in the 1975 NFL draft, Miller signed with the Birmingham Vulcans of the World Football League. He played in all 12 games for the Vulcans during the 1975 season before the league folded.

Miller signed with the Saskatchewan Roughriders of the Canadian Football League on April 12, 1976. On July 12, it was reported that he had been traded to the Winnipeg Blue Bombers for a second-round pick in the 1977 CFL draft. He played in two games for the Blue Bombers during the 1976 CFL season and recovered one fumble before being cut in early August. On August 17, Miller started a five-day trial with the Edmonton Eskimos. He ended up playing in eight games for the Eskimos that year. In early June 1977, Miller quit the Eskimos.

Miller was signed by the New York Giants on July 20, 1979. Prior to signing with the Giants, he had been working as a youth and recreation director at a church in Woodward, Oklahoma. He was released by New York on August 28 after the final preseason game. Miller then worked as the defensive line coach at Evangel College before being re-signed by the Giants on September 20. He played in 11 game, starting two, for the Giants during the 1979 season, posting one sack and two forced fumbles. Miller was released on August 10, 1980, after the first preseason game.

Miller signed with the Atlanta Falcons on November 20, 1980. He appeared in two games for the Falcons in a reserve role before being released on December 9, 1980.

== Personal life ==
During the 1970s, Miller was a graduate assistant at Oklahoma State and Tulsa. He was also working towards a master's in athletic administration from Tulsa.
