= 1974 Rice Owls football team =

American college football season

1974 Rice Owls football
- Conference: Southwest Conference
- Record: 2–8–1 (2–5 SWC)
- Head coach: Al Conover (3rd season)
- Home stadium: Rice Stadium

1974 Southwest Conference football standings
	Conf.					Overall
Team	W		L		T	W		L		T
No. 14 Baylor $	6	–	1	–	0	8	–	4	–	0
No. 17 Texas	5	–	2	–	0	8	–	4	–	0
No. 16 Texas A&M	5	–	2	–	0	8	–	3	–	0
Arkansas	3	–	3	–	1	6	–	4	–	1
SMU	3	–	3	–	1	6	–	4	–	1
Texas Tech	3	–	4	–	0	6	–	4	–	2
Rice	2	–	5	–	0	2	–	8	–	1
TCU	0	–	7	–	0	1	–	10	–	0
$ – Conference champion; Rankings from AP Poll

The 1974 Rice Owls football team was an American football team that represented Rice University in the Southwest Conference during the 1974 NCAA Division I football season. In their third year under head coach Al Conover, the team compiled a 2–8–1 record.

== Schedule ==
Date	Opponent	Site	Result	Attendance	Source
September 14	No. 19 Houston*	Rice Stadium; Houston, TX (rivalry)	L 0–21	40,000	
September 21	Cincinnati*	Rice Stadium; Houston, TX	L 21–28	15,000	
September 28	No. 17 LSU*	Rice Stadium; Houston, TX	T 10–10	55,000	
October 12	at No. 6 Notre Dame*	Notre Dame Stadium; Notre Dame, IN	L 3–10	59,075	
October 19	at SMU	Cotton Bowl; Dallas, TX (rivalry)	L 14–19	16,184	
October 26	No. 13 Texas	Rice Stadium; Houston, TX (rivalry)	L 6–27	56,500	
November 2	No. 13 Texas Tech	Rice Stadium; Houston, TX	W 21–7	19,500	
November 9	at Arkansas	Razorback Stadium; Fayetteville, AR	L 6–25	38,000	
November 16	at No. 10 Texas A&M	Kyle Field; College Station, TX	L 7–37	45,334	
November 23	TCU	Rice Stadium; Houston, TX	W 26–14	9,500	
November 30	at No. 16 Baylor	Baylor Stadium; Waco, TX	L 3–24	40,500	
*Non-conference game; Rankings from AP Poll released prior to the game
