= 1974 Texas Tech Red Raiders football team =

American college football season

1974 Texas Tech Red Raiders football

Peach Bowl, T 6–6 vs. Vanderbilt
- Conference: Southwest Conference
- Record: 6–4–2 (3–4 SWC)
- Head coach: Jim Carlen (5th season)
- Offensive scheme: No-huddle option
- Defensive coordinator: Richard Bell (5th season)
- Base defense: 4–3
- Home stadium: Jones Stadium

1974 Southwest Conference football standings
	Conf.					Overall
Team	W		L		T	W		L		T
No. 14 Baylor $	6	–	1	–	0	8	–	4	–	0
No. 17 Texas	5	–	2	–	0	8	–	4	–	0
No. 16 Texas A&M	5	–	2	–	0	8	–	3	–	0
Arkansas	3	–	3	–	1	6	–	4	–	1
SMU	3	–	3	–	1	6	–	4	–	1
Texas Tech	3	–	4	–	0	6	–	4	–	2
Rice	2	–	5	–	0	2	–	8	–	1
TCU	0	–	7	–	0	1	–	10	–	0
$ – Conference champion; Rankings from AP Poll

The 1974 Texas Tech Red Raiders football team represented Texas Tech University in the Southwest Conference (SWC) during the 1974 NCAA Division I football season. In their fifth and final season under head coach Jim Carlen, the Red Raiders compiled a 6–4–2 record (3–4 against conference opponents), finished in sixth place in the SWC, and outscored opponents by a combined total of 193 to 158. The team's statistical leaders included Tommy Duniven with 552 passing yards, Larry Isaac with 671 rushing yards, and Lawrence Williams with 477 receiving yards. The team played its home games at Clifford B. & Audrey Jones Stadium.

== Schedule ==
Date	Opponent	Rank	Site	TV	Result	Attendance	Source
September 14	Iowa State*		Jones Stadium; Lubbock, TX		W 24–3	38,542	
September 21	New Mexico*		University Stadium; Albuquerque, NM		T 21–21	17,719	
September 28	No. 6 Texas		Jones Stadium; Lubbock, TX (rivalry)		W 26–3	51,082	
October 5	Oklahoma State*	No. 10	Jones Stadium; Lubbock, TX		W 14–13	42,158	
October 12	at No. 16 Texas A&M	No. 9	Kyle Field; College Station, TX (rivalry)		L 7–28	50,620	
October 19	No. 9 Arizona*	No. 17	Jones Stadium; Lubbock, TX		W 17–8	40,231	
October 26	at SMU	No. 11	Cotton Bowl; Dallas, TX		W 20–17	32,505	
November 2	at Rice	No. 13	Rice Stadium; Houston, TX		L 7–21	19,500	
November 9	TCU^{†}	No. 19	Jones Stadium; Lubbock, TX (rivalry)		W 28–0	40,189	
November 16	at Baylor	No. 20	Baylor Stadium; Waco, TX (rivalry)		L 10–17	32,000	
November 23	Arkansas		Jones Stadium; Lubbock, TX (rivalry)		L 13–21	38,327	
December 28	vs. Vanderbilt*		Atlanta Stadium; Atlanta, GA (Peach Bowl)	ABC	T 6–6	31,695	
*Non-conference game; ^{†}Homecoming; Rankings from AP Poll released prior to the game
