= 1974 TCU Horned Frogs football team =

American college football season

1974 TCU Horned Frogs football
- Conference: Southwest Conference
- Record: 1–10 (0–7 SWC)
- Head coach: Jim Shofner (1st season)
- Offensive scheme: Pro-style
- Base defense: 4–3
- Home stadium: Amon G. Carter Stadium

1974 Southwest Conference football standings
	Conf.					Overall
Team	W		L		T	W		L		T
No. 14 Baylor $	6	–	1	–	0	8	–	4	–	0
No. 17 Texas	5	–	2	–	0	8	–	4	–	0
No. 16 Texas A&M	5	–	2	–	0	8	–	3	–	0
Arkansas	3	–	3	–	1	6	–	4	–	1
SMU	3	–	3	–	1	6	–	4	–	1
Texas Tech	3	–	4	–	0	6	–	4	–	2
Rice	2	–	5	–	0	2	–	8	–	1
TCU	0	–	7	–	0	1	–	10	–	0
$ – Conference champion; Rankings from AP Poll

The 1974 TCU Horned Frogs football team represented Texas Christian University (TCU) in the 1974 NCAA Division I football season. The Horned Frogs finished the season 1–10 overall and 0–7 in the Southwest Conference. The team was coached by Jim Shofner, in his first year as head coach. The Frogs played their home games in Amon G. Carter Stadium, which is located on campus in Fort Worth, Texas.

== Schedule ==
Date	Opponent	Site	Result	Attendance	Source
September 14	UT Arlington*	Amon G. Carter Stadium; Fort Worth, TX	W 12–3	17,210	
September 21	at No. 11 Arizona State*	Sun Devil Stadium; Tempe, AZ	L 7–37	50,811	
September 28	at Minnesota*	Memorial Stadium; Minneapolis, MN	L 7–9	32,822	
October 5	No. 20 Arkansas	Amon G. Carter Stadium; Fort Worth, TX	L 0–49	30,210	
October 12	SMU	Amon G. Carter Stadium; Fort Worth, TX (rivalry)	L 13–33	16,492	
October 19	at No. 8 Texas A&M	Kyle Field; College Station, TX (rivalry)	L 0–17	36,701	
October 26	at No. 4 Alabama*	Legion Field; Birmingham, AL	L 3–41	63,191	
November 2	Baylor	Amon G. Carter Stadium; Fort Worth, TX (rivalry)	L 7–21	18,792	
November 9	at No. 19 Texas Tech	Jones Stadium; Lubbock, TX (rivalry)	L 0–28	40,189	
November 16	Texas	Amon G. Carter Stadium; Fort Worth, TX (rivalry)	L 16–81	30,000	
November 23	at Rice	Rice Stadium; Houston, TX	L 14–26	9,500	
*Non-conference game; Rankings from AP Poll released prior to the game

== Roster ==
1974 TCU Horned Frogs football team roster
Players			Coaches
Offense: Pos. / # / Name / Class; QB / 10 / Lee Cook / Jr	Defense: Pos. / # / Name / Class	Special teams: Pos. / # / Name / Class	Head coach: Jim Shofner; Coordinators/assistant coaches Legend: (C) Team captain; (S) Suspended; (I) Ineligible; Injured; Redshirt
