= 1974 Texas A&M Aggies football team =

American college football season

1974 Texas A&M Aggies football
- Conference: Southwest Conference

Ranking
- Coaches: No. 15
- AP: No. 16
- Record: 8–3 (5–2 SWC)
- Head coach: Emory Bellard (3rd season)
- Offensive coordinator: Ben Hurt (3rd season)
- Offensive scheme: Wishbone
- Defensive coordinator: Melvin Robertson (3rd season)
- Home stadium: Kyle Field

1974 Southwest Conference football standings
	Conf.					Overall
Team	W		L		T	W		L		T
No. 14 Baylor $	6	–	1	–	0	8	–	4	–	0
No. 17 Texas	5	–	2	–	0	8	–	4	–	0
No. 16 Texas A&M	5	–	2	–	0	8	–	3	–	0
Arkansas	3	–	3	–	1	6	–	4	–	1
SMU	3	–	3	–	1	6	–	4	–	1
Texas Tech	3	–	4	–	0	6	–	4	–	2
Rice	2	–	5	–	0	2	–	8	–	1
TCU	0	–	7	–	0	1	–	10	–	0
$ – Conference champion; Rankings from AP Poll

The 1974 Texas A&M Aggies football team represented Texas A&M University as a member of the Southwest Conference (SWC) during the 1974 NCAA Division I football season. Led by third-year head coach Emory Bellard, the Aggies compiled an overall record of 8–3 with a mark of 5–2 in conference play, tying for second place in the SWC. Texas A&M played home games at Kyle Field in College Station, Texas.

== Schedule ==
Date	Opponent	Rank	Site	Result	Attendance	Source
September 14	Clemson*		Kyle Field; College Station, TX	W 24–0	38,792	
September 21	at No. 7 LSU*		Tiger Stadium; Baton Rouge, LA (rivalry)	W 21–14	69,088	
September 28	at Washington*	No. 9	Husky Stadium; Seattle, WA	W 28–15	54,000	
October 5	at Kansas*	No. 5	Memorial Stadium; Lawrence, KS	L 10–28	32,953–36,230	
October 12	No. 9 Texas Tech	No. 16	Kyle Field; College Station, TX (rivalry)	W 28–7	50,620	
October 19	TCU	No. 8	Kyle Field; College Station, TX (rivalry)	W 17–0	36,701	
October 26	at Baylor	No. 8	Baylor Stadium; Waco, TX (rivalry)	W 20–0	48,500–51,200	
November 2	Arkansas	No. 8	Kyle Field; College Station, TX (rivalry)	W 20–10	47,887	
November 9	at SMU	No. 5	Cotton Bowl; Dallas, TX	L 14–18	44,463	
November 16	Rice	No. 10	Kyle Field; College Station, TX	W 37–7	45,334	
November 29	at No. 17 Texas	No. 8	Memorial Stadium; Austin, TX (rivalry)	L 3–32	77,584	
*Non-conference game; Rankings from AP Poll released prior to the game

== Roster ==
1974 Texas A&M Aggies football team roster
Players
Coaches
Offense

Pos.	#	Name	Class
RB	44	Bubba Bean	Jr

Defense

Pos.	#	Name	Class
LB	77	Ed Simonini	Jr
LB	71	Garth Ten Napel	Jr

Special teams

Pos.	#	Name	Class
K	3	Lee White	Jr

Head coach

- Emory Bellard

Coordinators/assistant coaches

Legend

- (C) Team captain
- (S) Suspended
- (I) Ineligible
- Injured
- Redshirt
