= Mike Strachan (running back) =

American football player (born 1953)

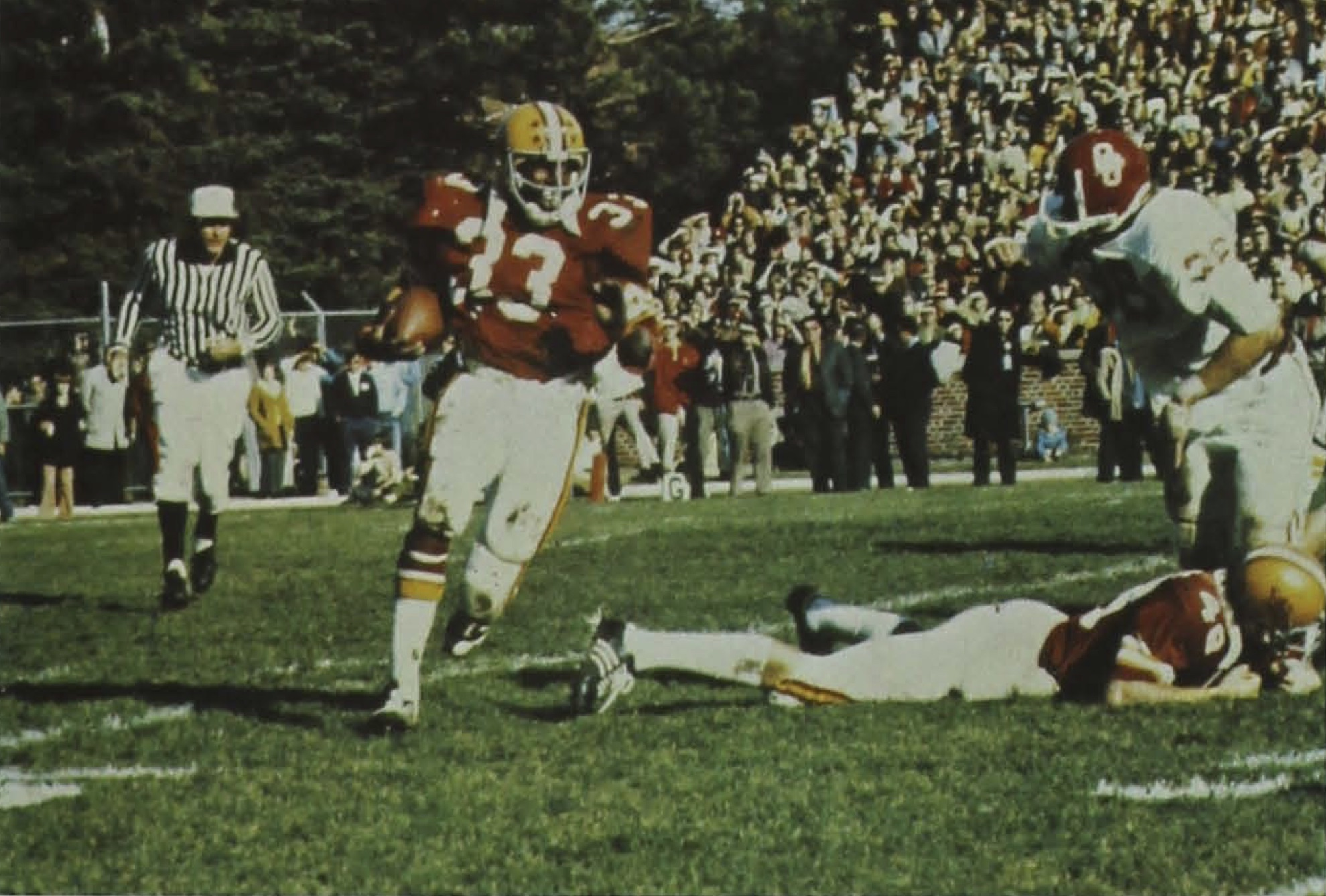
- Strachan with the Iowa State Cyclones in 1972

No. 33
- Position: Running back

Personal information
- Born: May 24, 1953 (age 73); Miami, Florida, U.S.
- Listed height: 6 ft 0 in (1.83 m)
- Listed weight: 199 lb (90 kg)

Career information
- High school: Jackson (Miami)
- College: Iowa State
- NFL draft: 1975: 9th round, 216th overall pick

Career history
- New Orleans Saints (1975–1980)

Awards and highlights
- First-team All-Big Eight (1973); Second-team All-Big Eight (1974)

Career NFL statistics
- Rushing yards: 1,902
- Rushing attempts: 472
- Rushing average: 4
- Fumbles: 17
- Receptions: 57
- Receiving yards: 392
- Touchdowns: 14
- Stats at Pro Football Reference

Michael David Strachan (born May 24, 1953) is an American former professional football player who was a running back in the National Football League (NFL). He played college football for the Iowa State Cyclones.

Strachan played for Jackson High School in Miami, Florida, and went to college at Iowa State University in Ames, Iowa, from 1972 to 1974 on an athletic scholarship. He was named All-Big Eight three times while a member of the Cyclones.

Strachan was selected by the New Orleans Saints in the ninth round of the 1975 NFL draft. He played six seasons for the Saints and was affectionately known as "the Hound". He led the Saints in rushing during his rookie season.

After his release by the Saints at the end of the 1980 season, he attempted to begin a career in real estate but that was cut short due to legal troubles. In 1982, Strachan was convicted of drug trafficking and sentenced to 3 years in federal prison after “about 10” Saints players including his former teammates Chuck Muncie and Dave Waymer, as well as two Saints who were drafted in 1981, George Rogers and Frank Warren, went before a grand jury and agreed to testify against Strachan in exchange for their immunity from prosecution. He served eighteen months of his sentence at Maxwell Air Force Base and was paroled early.

Strachan and his wife still live in the New Orleans area and he continues to work in real estate sales with RE/MAX. During an interview by WHNO Sports in 2012, he stated that he was a part owner of a couture furniture and art gallery on Dauphine Street in New Orleans called “Exagere” but it has since closed.

== NFL career statistics ==
Legend
**Bold**	Career high

Year	Team	Games		Rushing					Receiving				
Year	Team	GP	GS	Att	Yds	Avg	Lng	TD	Rec	Yds	Avg	Lng	TD
1975	NOR	11	**11**	**161**	**668**	4.1	21	2	**30**	**224**	7.5	**27**	0
1976	NOR	10	3	66	258	3.9	**31**	2	6	22	3.7	14	0
1977	NOR	13	3	55	271	**4.9**	18	0	3	26	8.7	10	0
1978	NOR	**15**	5	108	388	3.6	21	4	10	51	5.1	15	0
1979	NOR	10	1	62	276	4.5	23	**6**	3	9	3.0	5	0
1980	NOR	3	2	20	41	2.1	10	0	5	60	**12.0**	23	0
Career		62	25	472	1,902	4.0	31	14	57	392	6.9	27	0
