= Randy Young =

American football player (born 1954)

No. 70
- Position: Offensive tackle

Personal information
- Born: July 4, 1954 (age 72); Montgomery, Alabama, U.S.
- Listed height: 6 ft 5 in (1.96 m)
- Listed weight: 250 lb (113 kg)

Career information
- High school: Miami Carol City (Miami Gardens, Florida)
- College: Iowa State
- NFL draft: 1976: 12th round, 338th overall pick

Career history
- Miami Dolphins (1976)*; Tampa Bay Buccaneers (1976); Miami Dolphins (1977)*; Houston Oilers (1979–1980)
- * Offseason or practice squad member only

Career NFL statistics
- Games played: 9
- Stats at Pro Football Reference

Randall Louis Young (born July 4, 1954) is an American former professional football player who was an offensive lineman in the National Football League (NFL) for the Tampa Bay Buccaneers in 1976. He attended Carol City High School and played college football for the Iowa State Cyclones before being selected 338th overall by the Miami Dolphins in the 12th round of the 1976 NFL draft.
