= 1974 Oklahoma Sooners football team =

American college football season

1974 Oklahoma Sooners football
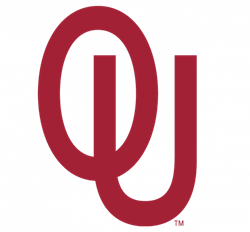

AP Poll national champion Big 8 champion
- Conference: Big Eight Conference

Ranking
- AP: No. 1
- Record: 11–0 (7–0 Big 8)
- Head coach: Barry Switzer (2nd season)
- Offensive coordinator: Galen Hall (2nd season)
- Offensive scheme: Wishbone
- Defensive coordinator: Larry Lacewell (5th season)
- Base defense: 5–2
- Captains: Kyle Davis; Steve Davis; Randy Hughes; Rod Shoate
- Home stadium: Oklahoma Memorial Stadium

1974 Big Eight Conference football standings
	Conf.					Overall
Team	W		L		T	W		L		T
No. 1 Oklahoma $	7	–	0	–	0	11	–	0	–	0
Missouri	5	–	2	–	0	7	–	4	–	0
No. 9 Nebraska	5	–	2	–	0	9	–	3	–	0
Oklahoma State	4	–	3	–	0	7	–	5	–	0
Colorado	3	–	4	–	0	5	–	6	–	0
Iowa State	2	–	5	–	0	4	–	7	–	0
Kansas	1	–	6	–	0	4	–	7	–	0
Kansas State	1	–	6	–	0	4	–	7	–	0
$ – Conference champion; Rankings from AP Poll

The 1974 Oklahoma Sooners football team represented the University of Oklahoma in the 1974 NCAA Division I football season. This was the first of three national championship squads for head coach Barry Switzer. Only one opponent played the Sooners within 14 points and four failed to score a touchdown. At the same time, OU led the nation in scoring offense with an average of 43 points per game to finish the season as the only undefeated team in the country at 11–0.

== Schedule ==
Date	Opponent	Rank	Site	Result	Attendance	Source
September 14	Baylor*	No. 1	Oklahoma Memorial Stadium; Norman, OK	W 28–11	62,375	
September 28	Utah State*	No. 3	Oklahoma Memorial Stadium; Norman, OK	W 72–3	62,065	
October 5	Wake Forest*	No. 2	Oklahoma Memorial Stadium; Norman, OK	W 63–0	61,191–61,826	
October 12	vs. No. 17 Texas*	No. 2	Cotton Bowl; Dallas, TX (Red River Shootout)	W 16–13	72,032	
October 19	at Colorado	No. 2	Folsom Field; Boulder, CO	W 49–14	51,777	
October 26	Kansas State	No. 2	Oklahoma Memorial Stadium; Norman, OK	W 63–0	61,826	
November 2	at Iowa State	No. 2	Clyde Williams Field; Ames, IA	W 28–10	35,000	
November 9	Missouri	No. 2	Oklahoma Memorial Stadium; Norman, OK (rivalry)	W 37–0	61,826	
November 16	at Kansas	No. 1	Memorial Stadium; Lawrence, KS	W 45–14	44,500	
November 23	No. 6 Nebraska	No. 1	Memorial Stadium; Lincoln, NE (rivalry)	W 28–14	76,636	
November 30	Oklahoma State	No. 1	Oklahoma Memorial Stadium; Norman, OK (Bedlam)	W 44–13	61,826	
*Non-conference game; Rankings from AP Poll released prior to the game; Source:

== Season summary ==
Oklahoma was loaded with talent, evidenced by its eight All-Americans, the most of any season to that point. OU's wishbone offense, triggered by running back Joe Washington, fullback Jim Littrell, and quarterback Steve Davis, averaged 73.9 rushing attempts per game, which still stands as an NCAA single-season record, as does its 21.4 rushing first downs per game.

Oklahoma also featured a tough defense led by senior All-American Rod Shoate, a swift and punishing linebacker, and a defensive front consisting of brothers Lee Roy and Dewey Selmon, and Jimbo Elrod.

Because Oklahoma was on NCAA probation for recruiting violations, it was ineligible for ranking in the Coaches Poll and could not appear on network television or appear in a postseason bowl game. Nevertheless, the Sooners opened the '74 season as the top-ranked team in the AP Poll, the first time since 1957 that OU debuted at #1 and the first time in 11 years that Oklahoma sat atop the poll. Despite being a 43-point favorite against Baylor, the Sooners struggled in their season opener, needing three fourth-quarter touchdowns to secure a 28–11 victory. Baylor recovered from this loss and enjoyed a stellar season, winning the Southwest Conference championship under third-year coach Grant Teaff.

The win did not impress AP voters, and OU dropped to #3 behind Ohio State and Notre Dame. The Sooners quickly rebounded by destroying Utah State and Wake Forest in back-to-back weeks by a combined score of 135–3. Eight Sooners scored touchdowns against Utah State, while nine players found the end zone against the Demon Deacons.

Next up for the Sooners was the Red River Shootout, and the Texas Longhorns presented Oklahoma's toughest challenge yet. Trailing 13–7 in the fourth quarter, OU dug into its bag of tricks with a reverse to split end Billy Brooks, who scampered 40 yards down the sideline for a touchdown. The ensuing extra point attempt by Sooner kicker John Carroll was ruled no good, leaving the game tied at 13–13. Oklahoma's defense rose to the challenge, led by Shoate, who finished the game with 21 tackles, two pass breakups, a forced fumble, and a fumble recovery. The last statistic was the critical one, as the Sooners forced a Texas fumble on the next possession, which Shoate recovered at the 50. A 37–yard field goal from Tony DiRienzo minutes later was the difference. "This was as close as a game can be", coach Switzer said afterward. A testament to how hard the game was fought, OU offensive tackle Mike Vaughan reportedly passed out from exhaustion following the game.

The Sooners followed their victory over Texas with a pair of blowouts over #16 Colorado, 49-14, and Kansas State, 63–0. Joe Washington rushed for 200 yards and four touchdowns against the Buffaloes, while eight players found the end zone versus the Wildcats. After a sloppy performance on a soggy field in a 28–10 win at Iowa State, Oklahoma shutout a tough Missouri squad 37–0, a team that had beaten Nebraska and scored 82 points in its previous two games. OU's third shutout of the season ran its record to 8–0 as top-ranked Ohio State was upset by Michigan State, 16–13.

Oklahoma regained the #1 ranking and, following a 45–14 win over Kansas, traveled to Lincoln with a Big Eight Conference title on the line. OU changed its defense for the game against Nebraska, using man-to-man coverage instead of zone. The move paid dividends as the Sooners intercepted four passes, including three by Randy Hughes, while the offense rolled up 482 yards on the ground despite not completing a single pass in the contest. The victory earned Oklahoma its second straight Big Eight Championship with one game remaining against Oklahoma State. Against the Cowboys, OU faced a 13–10 deficit late in the third quarter before scoring five touchdowns during a seven–and–a–half–minute span. The 44–13 victory marked OU's 20th consecutive win and 29th straight game without a loss.

When Alabama fell to Notre Dame in the Orange Bowl, the Sooners were left as the nation's only unbeaten team. With a #1 ranking in the final AP Poll, OU laid claim to its fourth national championship and first since 1956. To date, the 1974 Sooners are the last NCAA Division I-A team to claim an AP national title without benefit of a postseason bowl win.

== Game summaries ==
=== Wake Forest ===
Wake Forest Demon Deacons at #2 Oklahoma Sooners

Team	1	2	3	4	Total
Wake Forest	0	0	0	0	0
• #2 Oklahoma	14	28	7	14	63

- Date: October 5
- Location: Oklahoma Memorial Stadium, Norman, Oklahoma

Scoring summary
1	OU	Burget 18-yard run (Carroll kick)	OU 7-0
1	OU	Washington 65-yard run (Carroll kick)	OU 14-0
2	OU	Hoffman 7-yard pass from Davis (Carroll kick)	OU 21-0
2	OU	Peacock 55-yard run (Carroll kick)	OU 28-0
2	OU	Owens 32-yard pass from Davis (Carroll kick)	OU 35-0
2	OU	Berg 1-yard run (Carroll kick)	OU 42-0
3	OU	Brooks 42-yard pass from Blevins (Carroll kick)	OU 49-0
4	OU	Blevins 1-yard run (Carroll kick)	OU 56-0
4	OU	Russell 70-yard run (Carroll kick)	OU 63-0

=== Texas (Red River Shootout) ===
#2 Oklahoma Sooners vs. #17 Texas Longhorns

Team	1	2	3	4	Total
#17 Texas	0	3	7	3	13
• #2 Oklahoma	0	7	0	9	16

- Date: October 12
- Location: Cotton Bowl • Dallas, Texas
- Game attendance: 75,000

Scoring summary
2	OKLA	Davis 22-yard run (Carroll kick)	Oklahoma 7-0
2	TEX	Schott 21-yard field goal	Oklahoma 7-3
3	TEX	Campbell 12-yard run (Schott kick)	Texas 10-7
4	TEX	Schott 38-yard field goal	Texas 13-7
4	OKLA	Brooks 40-yard run (kick failed)	Tie 13-13
4	OKLA	DiRienzo 37-yard field goal	Oklahoma 16-13

== Personnel ==
1974 Oklahoma Sooners football team roster
Players
Coaches
Offense

Pos.	#	Name	Class
OT	73	Drake Andarakes	Sr
HB		Vickey Ray Anderson	Fr
G		Tyrone Armstrong	Jr
OT	74	Jerry Arnold	Sr
G	61	Gary Baily	Jr
OT		Karl Baldischwiler	Fr
RB	20	Bob Berg	Sr
QB	2	Dean Blevins	Fr
C		Jeff Bodin	Jr
HB	22	Larry Briggs	Jr
WR	82	Billy Brooks	Jr
HB		Jeff Brown	Fr
C	55	Dennis Buchanan	Sr
RB		John Bunch	Fr
RB	25	Grant Burget	Sr
E		Marshall Cantrell	So
OT		Brett Cargill	So
OT		Sam Claphan	Fr
RB	33	Waymon Clark	Sr
OT		Reed Coody	So
FB	17	Ken Crosswhite	So
G		Jim Culbreath	Jr
C	50	Kyle Davis	Sr
QB	7	Steve Davis	Jr
OT	72	Jim Dodds	So
C	52	Todd Dutton	So
OT		Rick Evans	Jr
OT		Jody Farthing	Fr
HB		Jerry Foster	Jr
FB	46	Calvin Harris	Fr
RB		Zac Henderson	Fr
HB		R. J. Hendricks	So
G		Jay Holman	So
WR	9	Lee Hover	So
HB		Greg Hutchings	So
RB	29	Horace Ivory	Jr
QB	14	Kerry Jackson	Jr
TE	83	Kirk Killion	Sr
C	51	Ralph Kulbeth	So
FB	42	Jim Littrell	Jr
QB	6	Jeff Mabry	Jr
OT	78	Leo Martin	Jr
HB	32	Richard McCampbell	So
G	61	Marc McCloud	Jr
FB		Danny McClure	Jr
QB	1	Joe McReynolds	So
G	61	Jaime Melendez	So
WR		Roger Owens	So
WR	11	Tinker Owens	Jr
HB	4	Elvis Peacock	Fr
WR	12	Doug Pearson	Jr
TE	85	Gary Potters	Sr
OT		John Randolph	So
RB		Jimmy Rogers	Fr
OT		Phil Roland	Fr
G	62	John Roush	Sr
HB	30	Clyde Russell	Sr
HB	39	Kleyn Russell	Sr
HB	8	Myron Shoate	Fr
FB	45	Doug Simcik	So
HB		Robert Steward	Jr
G	68	David Sullivan	Jr
G	67	Jim Taylor	Sr
OT	79	Mike Vaughan	So
OT		Jeff Ward	Fr
HB	24	Joe Washington	Jr
G	66	Terry Webb	Jr
TE		Truman Westfall	So
HB		Edward Williams	So
OT		Lonnie Wright	So
HB	37	Gary Young	Sr

Defense

Pos.	#	Name	Class
DE	88	Duane Baccus	So
DE		Gary Barnoskie	So
NG	95	John Barresi	Sr
DT	99	David Bentley	Jr
SS	15	Mike Birks	Jr
DE		Gary Bishop	So
DT	97	Barry Brady	Jr
LB	49	Marty Brecht	So
CB	21	Sidney Brown	So
DE	92	Victor Brown	So
DT	71	Anthony Bryant	So
LB	56	Glenn Comeaux	Sr
DE	53	Jeff Cox	So
LB		Bill Dalke	So
LB		George Davis	So
NG		Larry Duke	So
LB		Dick Dutton	Jr
DL	54	Jimbo Elrod	Jr
DL		Jeff Emel	Jr
LB	44	Joel Estes	Fr
DT	75	Chez Evans	So
DL		Kenneth Franklin	Fr
LB	41	Gary Gibbs	Sr
LB		Robbie Green	So
LB		Rusty Griffis	Fr
NG		Joe Hale	Jr
DB	7	Scott Hill	So
DE	81	Wayne Hoffman	Sr
DT		Dave Hudgens	So
DB	19	Randy Hughes	Sr
LB		Howard Humphreys	Fr
S	23	Pat Hussey	Sr
DB		Tyrrell Jackson	So
CB	18	David James	So
LB		Harvey Johnson	Fr
LB		Steve Kunkle	So
DB		Steve Larghe	So
LB	47	Chavez Linzy	Jr
DE	59	Steve Ludwig	Jr
DE	84	Craig Lund	Jr
LB	57	Obie Moore	So
LB		Don Morton	Jr
DE		Richard Murray	Fr
DB	16	Tony Peters	Sr
DE	89	Mike Phillips	So
LB		Ted Phillips	So
DB		Mike Pleasant	Fr
DB		Scott Ray	So
S	27	Jerry Reese	So
CB	26	Frank Rohr	So
DT	91	Dewey Selmon	Jr
DT	93	Lee Roy Selmon	Jr
LB		Terry Sherman	Fr
LB	43	Rod Shoate	Sr
CB	34	E. N. Simon	Jr
S	9	Larry Stacy	So
CB		Tony Sutton	Sr
NG	94	Larry Tate	Jr
LB	38	Jamie Thomas	Jr
SS	28	Keith Thomas	Jr
CB	31	Eric Van Camp	Jr
NG	98	George Walrond	So
SS	35	Ron Waters	Sr
LB	48	Russ Williamson	So
S		Steve Wukman	So

Special teams

Pos.	#	Name	Class
K	10	John Carroll	Sr
K		Shane Corrotto	So
K	3	Tony DiRienzo	Jr
K	41	Bill Shirk	Fr

Head coach

- Barry Switzer

Coordinators/assistant coaches

- Donnie Duncan
- Galen Hall (OC)
- Warren Harper (LB)
- Gene Hochevar
- Larry Lacewell (DC)
- Wendell Mosley (RB)
- Rex Norris (DL)
- Jerry Pettibone

Legend

- (C) Team captain
- (S) Suspended
- (I) Ineligible
- Injured
- Redshirt

Roster

== Rankings ==
Ranking movements Legend: ██ Increase in ranking ██ Decrease in ranking — = Not ranked ( ) = First-place votes
	Week														
Poll	Pre	1	2	3	4	5	6	7	8	9	10	11	12	13	Final
AP	1 (23)	1 (22)	3 (18)	3 (8)	2 (24.2)	2 (24)	2 (5)	2 (8)	2 (10)	2 (14)	1 (48)	1 (45)	1 (49)	1 (49)	1 (51)
Coaches Poll	—	—	—	—	—	—	—	—	—	—	—	—	—	—	—

== After the season ==
=== NFL draft ===
The following players were drafted into the National Football League following the season.

Round	Pick	Player	Position	NFL team
2	41	Rod Shoate	Linebacker	New England Patriots
4	82	Tony Peters	Defensive back	Cleveland Browns
4	96	Randy Hughes	Defensive back	Dallas Cowboys
5	113	Kyle Davis	Center	Dallas Cowboys
6	134	John Carroll	Wide receiver	San Diego Chargers
8	189	Wayne Hoffman	Tackle	Kansas City Chiefs
10	239	Clyde Russell	Guard	Miami Dolphins
14	355	Jerry Arnold	Running back	Denver Broncos
15	370	John Roush	Running back	San Diego Chargers
15	372	Grant Burget	Guard	New Orleans Saints
