= Robert Miller (running back) =

American football player (born 1953)

No. 35
- Position: Running back

Personal information
- Born: January 9, 1953 (age 73); Houston, Texas, U.S.
- Listed height: 5 ft 11 in (1.80 m)
- Listed weight: 204 lb (93 kg)

Career information
- High school: Yates (Houston)
- College: Kansas
- NFL draft: 1975: 5th round, 129th overall pick

Career history
- Minnesota Vikings (1975–1980)

Career NFL statistics
- Rushing attempts: 275
- Rushing yards: 951
- Rushing TDs: 7
- Stats at Pro Football Reference

Robert Miller (born January 9, 1953) is an American former professional football player who was a running back for six seasons with the Minnesota Vikings of the National Football League (NFL). He played college football for the Kansas Jayhawks. Miller played high school football at Jack Yates High School from 1968 through 1971.
