= Randy Hart =

American football player and coach (born 1948)

Biographical details
- Born: March 9, 1948 (age 78); Cleveland, Ohio, U.S.
- Education: Ohio State University

Playing career
- Position: Offensive guard

Coaching career (HC unless noted)
- 1970–1971: Ohio State (GA)
- 1972: Tampa (OL)
- 1973–1976: Iowa State (DL)
- 1977–1981: Purdue (DL)
- 1982–1987: Ohio State (DL)
- 1988–1994: Washington (DL)
- 1995–1998: Washington (AHC/DC/DL)
- 1999–2008: Washington (DL)
- 2009: Notre Dame (DL)
- 2010–2015: Stanford (DL)

Accomplishments and honors

Championships
- National (1968)

Randy Hart (born March 9, 1948) is an American former football player and coach, earning national championships as both a player and coach.

He served as a college assistant coach for over forty seasons including over twenty at the University of Washington. Hart primarily served as a defensive line coach during his career.

== High school ==
Hart was a three-time letterman in football, wrestling and track at South High School in Willoughby, Ohio.

== College ==
Hart earned three letters as an offensive guard on the Ohio State Buckeye football team under coach Woody Hayes. He graduated with a bachelor's degree in education in 1970, then earned a master's degree in higher education administration in 1972.

== Coaching career ==
Hart coached under four College Football Hall of Fame members: Woody Hayes, Earle Bruce, Jim Young, and Don James. Hart's participation in 10 Rose Bowls are the second most in the game's history. Hart retired from coaching after the conclusion of the 2015 season.
