= Reggie Pierson =

American football player (born 1952)

No. 27, 20
- Position: Cornerback

Personal information
- Born: December 13, 1952 (age 73); Los Angeles, California, U.S.
- Listed height: 5 ft 11 in (1.80 m)
- Listed weight: 185 lb (84 kg)

Career information
- High school: Centennial
- College: Oklahoma State
- NFL draft: 1975: undrafted

Career history
- Denver Broncos (1975)*; Detroit Lions (1976); Tampa Bay Buccaneers (1976); Winnipeg Blue Bombers (1978–1983)
- * Offseason or practice squad member only
- Stats at Pro Football Reference

Reginald Lee Pierson (He was born in Los Angeles, California and attended Centennial High School, then Arizona Western College and finally Oklahoma State University.
