= Greg Westbrooks =

American football player (born 1953)

No. 60, 52, 57
- Position: Linebacker

Personal information
- Born: February 24, 1953 (age 73); Chicago, Illinois, U.S.
- Listed height: 6 ft 2 in (1.88 m)
- Listed weight: 215 lb (98 kg)

Career information
- College: Mesa (CO); Colorado
- NFL draft: 1975: 17th round, 422nd overall pick

Career history
- New Orleans Saints (1975–1977); Oakland Raiders (1978); St. Louis Cardinals (1978); Los Angeles Rams (1979); Oakland Raiders (1979); Los Angeles Rams (1980); Oakland Raiders (1980–1981)

Awards and highlights
- Super Bowl champion (XV)

Career NFL statistics
- Interceptions: 1
- Fumble recoveries: 2
- Sacks: 5
- Stats at Pro Football Reference

Gregory Melvin Westbrooks (born February 24, 1953) is an American former professional football player who played as a linebacker for the New Orleans Saints, Oakland Raiders, St. Louis Cardinals, and Los Angeles Rams for a combined total of seven seasons.
