= Big Eight Conference =

Former U.S. college athletics conference

- Formerly: Missouri Valley Intercollegiate Athletic Association (1907–1964); Big Six Conference (1928–1948, unofficial); Big Seven Conference (1948–1957, unofficial); Big Eight Conference (1957–1964, unofficial)
- Association: NCAA
- Founded: 1907; 119 years ago
- Folded: 1996; 30 years ago
- Commissioner: Carl C. James (final) 1980–1996
- Sports fielded: 21; men's: 11; women's: 10
- Division: Division I
- No. of teams: 8 (final), 12 (total)
- Headquarters: Kansas City, Missouri, U.S.
- Region: Midwestern United States, Mountain States, West South Central States

Locations

The Big Eight Conference was a National Collegiate Athletic Association (NCAA)-affiliated Division I-A college athletic association that sponsored football. It was formed in January 1907 as the Missouri Valley Intercollegiate Athletic Association (MVIAA) by its charter member schools: the University of Kansas, University of Missouri, University of Nebraska, and Washington University in St. Louis. Additionally, the University of Iowa was an original member of the MVIAA, while maintaining joint membership in the Western Conference (now the Big Ten Conference).

The conference's membership at its dissolution consisted of the University of Nebraska, Iowa State University, the University of Colorado at Boulder, the University of Kansas, Kansas State University, the University of Missouri, the University of Oklahoma, and Oklahoma State University. The Big Eight's headquarters were located in Kansas City, Missouri.

In February 1994, all eight members of the Big Eight Conference and four of the members of the Southwest Conference announced that the 12 schools had reached an agreement to form the Big 12 Conference. From a conventional standpoint, the Big 12 was a renamed and expanded version of the Big Eight, but from a legal standpoint, the Big Eight ceased operations in 1996, and its members joined with the four SWC schools (Texas, Texas A&M, Baylor, and Texas Tech) to form the Big 12 the following year.

== History ==
=== Formation ===
The conference was founded as the Missouri Valley Intercollegiate Athletic Association (MVIAA) at a meeting on January 12, 1907, of five charter member institutions: the University of Kansas, the University of Missouri, the University of Nebraska, Washington University in St. Louis, and the University of Iowa, which also maintained its concurrent membership in the Western Conference (now the Big Ten Conference). However, Iowa only participated in football and outdoor men's track and field for a brief period before leaving the conference in 1911.

=== Early membership changes ===
In 1908, Drake University and Iowa Agricultural College (now Iowa State University) joined the MVIAA, increasing the conference's membership to seven. Iowa, which was a joint member, departed the conference in 1911 to return to sole competition in the Western Conference, but Kansas State University joined the conference in 1913. Nebraska left in 1918 to play as an independent for two seasons before returning in 1920. In 1919, the University of Oklahoma and Saint Louis University applied for membership but were not approved due to deficient management of their athletic programs. The conference then added Grinnell College in 1919, with the University of Oklahoma applying again and being approved in 1920. Oklahoma A&M University (now Oklahoma State University) joined in 1925, bringing conference membership to ten, an all-time high.

=== Split into Big Six Conference ===
At a meeting in Lincoln, Nebraska, on May 19, 1928, the conference split up. Six of the seven state schools (all except Oklahoma A&M) formed a conference that was initially known as the Big Six Conference. Just before the start of fall practice, the six schools announced they would retain the MVIAA name for formal purposes. However, fans and media continued to call it the Big Six. The three private schools – Drake, Grinnell, and Washington University – joined with Oklahoma A&M to form the Missouri Valley Conference (MVC). The old MVIAA's administrative staff transferred to the MVC.

The similarity of the two conferences' official names, as well as the competing claims of the two conferences, led to considerable debate over which conference was the original and which was the spin-off, though the MVIAA went on to become the more prestigious of the two. For the remainder of the Big Eight's run, both conferences claimed 1907 as their founding date, as well as the same history through 1927. To this day, it has never been definitively established which conference was the original.

=== Big Seven adds Colorado ===
Conference membership grew with the addition of the University of Colorado on December 1, 1947, from the Mountain States Conference. Later that month, Reaves E. Peters was hired as "Commissioner of Officials and Assistant Secretary" and set up the first conference offices in Kansas City, Missouri. With the addition of Colorado, the conference's unofficial name became the Big Seven Conference, coincidentally, the former unofficial name of the MSC.

=== Big Eight adds Oklahoma State ===
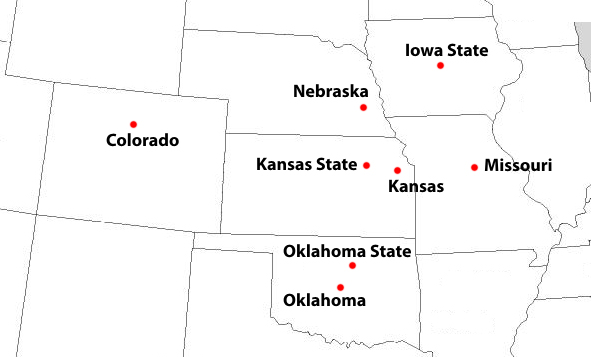
Locations of final Big Eight Conference full member institutions between 1957 and 1995

The final membership change happened ten years later, when Oklahoma A&M, newly renamed Oklahoma State, joined (or rejoined, depending on the source) the conference on June 1, 1957, and the conference became known as the Big Eight. However, Oklahoma State did not begin conference play until the 1958–59 season for basketball and the 1960 season for football. Peters' title was changed to "Executive Secretary" of the conference in 1957. He retired in June 1963 and was replaced by Wayne Duke, whose title was later changed to "Commissioner".

In 1964, the conference legally assumed the name Big Eight Conference. In 1968 the conference began a long association with the Orange Bowl, sending its champion annually to play in the prestigious bowl game in Miami, Florida, all except the 1974 Orange Bowl and the 1975 Orange Bowl. Instead, Big Eight representative Nebraska Cornhuskers played in the 1974 Cotton Bowl Classic and the 1974 Sugar Bowl (Oklahoma, which won the conference championship in 1973 and 1974, was banned from bowl games in those seasons as part of NCAA probation).

=== Formation of the Big 12 Conference ===
In the early 1990s, most of the colleges in Division I-A (now known as the Football Bowl Subdivision) were members of the College Football Association; this included members of the Big Eight and Southwest Conferences. Following a Supreme Court decision in 1984, the primary function of the CFA was to negotiate television broadcast rights for its member conferences and independent colleges. In February 1994, the Southeastern Conference announced that they, like the Big Ten, Pac-10, and Notre Dame before them, would be leaving the CFA and negotiating independently for a television deal that covered SEC schools only. This led The Dallas Morning News to proclaim that "the College Football Association as a television entity is dead". More significantly, this change in television contracts ultimately would lead to significant realignment of college conferences, with the biggest change being the dissolution of the Big Eight and Southwest Conferences and the formation of the Big 12.

After the SEC's abandonment of the CFA, the Southwest Conference and the Big Eight Conference saw potential financial benefits from an alliance to negotiate television deals, and quickly began negotiations to that end, with ABC and ESPN. On February 25, 1994, it was announced that a new conference would be formed from the members of the Big Eight and four of the Texas member colleges of the Southwest Conference. Though the name would not be made official for several months, newspaper accounts immediately dubbed the new entity the "Big 12". Charter members of the Big 12 included the members of the Big Eight plus Baylor, Texas, Texas A&M and Texas Tech.

=== Dissolution ===
Following the formation of the Big 12 Conference in 1994, the Big Eight continued operations until August 30, 1996, when the conference was formally dissolved and its members officially began competition in the Big 12 Conference. Although the Big 12 was essentially the Big Eight plus the four Texas schools, the Big 12 regards itself as a separate conference and does not claim the Big Eight's history as its own.

== Members ==
=== Final members ===
Institution	Location	Founded	Joined	Type	Enrollment	Endowment	Nickname	Colors	Varsity Sports	National Titles
University of Colorado	Boulder, Colorado	1876	1947	Public	30,128	$665,000,000	Buffaloes	*	14	28
Iowa State University	Ames, Iowa	1858	1908	Public	28,682	$452,200,000	Cyclones		16	18
University of Kansas	Lawrence, Kansas	1865	1907	Public	30,004	$1,005,000,000	Jayhawks		16	13
Kansas State University	Manhattan, Kansas	1863	1913	Public	23,588	$277,600,000	Wildcats		14	0
University of Missouri	Columbia, Missouri	1839	1907	Public	33,318	$974,900,000	Tigers		18	2
University of Nebraska	Lincoln, Nebraska	1869	1907	Public	24,100	$1,140,000,000	Cornhuskers		21	23
University of Oklahoma	Norman, Oklahoma	1890	1919	Public	29,721	$968,400,000	Sooners		19	27
Oklahoma State University	Stillwater, Oklahoma	1890	1958	Public	23,307	$311,000,000	Cowboys		16	55

(*In the early 1980s, Colorado's colors were sky blue and gold.)

=== Previous members ===
Institution	Location	Founded	Type	Enrollment	Endowment	Nickname	Colors	Varsity Sports	NCAA Titles
Drake University	Des Moines, Iowa	1881	Private	3,164	$135,000,000	Bulldogs		18	3
Grinnell College	Grinnell, Iowa	1846	Private	1,688	$1,260,000,000	Pioneers		18	0
University of Iowa	Iowa City, Iowa	1847	Public	30,825	$1,580,000,000	Hawkeyes		24	25
Washington University in St. Louis	St. Louis, Missouri	1853	Private	13,995	$4,600,000,000	Bears		17	19 (Div. III)

=== Membership timeline ===
Full members
Other conference
Big Eight members who were among the founding members of the Big 12 Conference

=== Subsequent conference affiliations ===
Team	Left for	Current home
Colorado	Big 12 Conference^{1}	
Drake	Missouri Valley Conference	Pioneer Football League; Missouri Valley Conference^{2}
Grinnell	Missouri Valley Conference	Midwest Conference^{3}
Iowa	Big Ten Conference	
Iowa State	Big 12 Conference	
Kansas	Big 12 Conference	
Kansas State	Big 12 Conference	
Missouri	Big 12 Conference	Southeastern Conference^{4}
Nebraska	Big 12 Conference	Big Ten Conference^{5}
Oklahoma	Big 12 Conference	Southeastern Conference^{6}
Oklahoma State	Big 12 Conference	
Washington University in St. Louis	Missouri Valley Conference	University Athletic Association^{7} College Conference of Illinois and Wisconsin

1. Colorado left the Big 12 for the Pac-12 beginning with the 2011–12 season. It rejoined the Big 12 in 2024.
2. Drake withdrew from the Missouri Valley Conference from 1951 to 1956. The MVC stopped sponsoring football in 1985; Drake remains a member for all non-football sports. The football program dropped to Division III in 1987, playing as an independent until a change in NCAA rules forced the program to play in Division I. When the new rule took effect in 1993, Drake joined the newly formed Pioneer League, a football-only league playing at the FCS level that prohibits the awarding of football scholarships.
3. Grinnell joined the Midwest Collegiate Athletic Conference beginning with the 1939–40 season; their affiliation from 1928 to 1939 is unclear. The MCAC merged with the Midwest Athletic Conference for Women to form the Midwest Conference beginning with the 1994–95 season.
4. Missouri left the Big 12 for the SEC beginning with the 2012–13 season.
5. Nebraska left the Big 12 for the Big Ten beginning with the 2011–12 season.
6. Oklahoma left the Big 12 for the SEC beginning with the 2024–25 season.
7. Washington University left the MVC in 1946; it joined the College Athletic Conference from 1962 through 1971, and became a charter member of the University Athletic Association, which began play with the 1986–87 season. It was independent in all other years. Washington University is now a football-only affiliate member of the College Conference of Illinois and Wisconsin.

== Commissioners ==
- Reaves Peters (1947–1963) as Executive Secretary
- Wayne Duke (1963–1971)
- Chuck Neinas (1971–1980)
- Carl C. James (1980–1996)

== Conference champions ==
=== Men's basketball ===
Following are the MVIAA/Big Eight regular-season conference champions from 1908 to 1996 (showing shared championships in italics):

Men's basketball regular-season championships (1908–1996)
School	Total titles	Outright titles	Years
Colorado	5	3	1954 · 1955 · 1962 · 1963 · 1969
Drake	0	0	
Grinnell	0	0	
Iowa State	4	2	1935 · 1941 · 1944 · 1945
Kansas	43	32	1908 · 1909 · 1910 · 1911 · 1912 · 1914 · 1915 · 1922 · 1923 · 1924 · 1925 · 1926 · 1927 · 1931 · 1932 · 1933 · 1934 · 1936 · 1937 · 1938 · 1940 · 1941 · 1942 · 1943 · 1946 · 1950 · 1952 · 1953 · 1954 · 1957 · 1960 · 1966 · 1967 · 1971 · 1974 · 1975 · 1978 · 1986 · 1991 · 1992 · 1993 · 1995 · 1996
Kansas State	17	14	1917 · 1919 · 1948 · 1950 · 1951 · 1956 · 1958 · 1959 · 1960 · 1961 · 1963 · 1964 · 1968 · 1970 · 1972 · 1973 · 1977
Missouri	15	12	1918 · 1920 · 1921 · 1922 · 1930 · 1939 · 1940 · 1976 · 1980 · 1981 · 1982 · 1983 · 1987 · 1990 · 1994
Nebraska	7	2	1912 · 1913 · 1914 · 1916 · 1937 · 1949 · 1950
Oklahoma	13	8	1928 · 1929 · 1939 · 1940 · 1942 · 1944 · 1947 · 1949 · 1979 · 1984 · 1985 · 1988 · 1989
Oklahoma State	2	1	1965 · 1991
Washington (St. Louis)	0	0	

=== Women's basketball ===
From 1981 to 1996, women played basketball in the Big Eight Conference.

Women's basketball regular-season championships (1981–1996)
School	Total titles	Years
Colorado	4	1989 · 1993 · 1994 · 1995
Kansas State	4	1982 · 1983 · 1984 · 1987
Kansas	2	1992 · 1996
Missouri	2	1985 · 1990
Nebraska	1	1988
Oklahoma State	1	1986
Oklahoma	1	1991

=== Football ===
Shared championships are shown in italics:

Football conference championships (1907–1995)
School	Total titles	Outright titles	Years
Colorado	5	3	1961 · 1976 · 1989 · 1990 · 1991
Drake	0	0	
Grinnell	0	0	
Iowa	1	0	1907
Iowa State	2	0	1911 · 1912
Kansas	5	2	1908 · 1930 · 1946 · 1947 · 1968
Kansas State	1	1	1934
Missouri	12	10	1909 · 1913 · 1919 · 1924 · 1925 · 1927 · 1939 · 1941 · 1942 · 1945 · 1960^{†} · 1969
Nebraska	41	31	1907 · 1910 · 1911 · 1912 · 1913 · 1914 · 1915 · 1916 · 1917 · 1921 · 1922 · 1923 · 1928 · 1929 · 1931 · 1932 · 1933 · 1935 · 1936 · 1937 · 1940 · 1963 · 1964 · 1965 · 1966 · 1969 · 1970 · 1971 · 1972^{‡} · 1975 · 1978 · 1981 · 1982 · 1983 · 1984 · 1988 · 1991 · 1992 · 1993 · 1994 · 1995
Oklahoma	34	26	1920 · 1933 · 1938 · 1943 · 1944 · 1946 · 1947 · 1948 · 1949 · 1950 · 1951 · 1952 · 1953 · 1954 · 1955 · 1956 · 1957 · 1958 · 1959 · 1962; 1967 · 1968 · 1972^{‡} · 1974 · 1975 · 1976 · 1977 · 1978 · 1979 · 1980 · 1984 · 1985 · 1986 · 1987
Oklahoma State	2	1	1926 · 1976
Washington (St. Louis)	0	0	

^{†} Kansas would have won the 1960 title, but after found to be using an ineligible player they were forced to forfeit their victories over Missouri and Colorado, which meant that Missouri was awarded the 1960 Big Eight title.
^{‡} Oklahoma initially won the 1972 title, but after it was found that they used ineligible players, they were penalized by the NCAA, though they did not force OU to forfeit games. The Big Eight asked them to forfeit three games and awarded the title to Nebraska, but Oklahoma still claims these wins and this title.

== National championships won by MVIAA/Big Eight members ==
The following is a complete list of the 100 AIAW, NCAA and college football championships won by teams that were representing the Big Eight Conference in NCAA- or AIAW-recognized sports at the time of the championship.

Football (11):
1950 – Oklahoma
1955 – Oklahoma
1956 – Oklahoma
1970 – Nebraska
1971 – Nebraska
1974 – Oklahoma
1975 – Oklahoma
1985 – Oklahoma
1990 – Colorado
1994 – Nebraska
1995 – Nebraska

Baseball (4):
1951 – Oklahoma
1954 – Missouri
1959 – Oklahoma State
1994 – Oklahoma

Men's basketball (2):
1952 – Kansas
1988 – Kansas

Men's Cross Country (3):
1953 – Kansas
1989 – Iowa State
1994 – Iowa State

Women's Cross Country (5):
1975 – Iowa State
1976 – Iowa State
1977 – Iowa State
1978 – Iowa State
1981 – Iowa State

Men's golf (9):
1963 – Oklahoma State
1976 – Oklahoma State
1978 – Oklahoma State
1980 – Oklahoma State
1983 – Oklahoma State
1987 – Oklahoma State
1989 – Oklahoma
1991 – Oklahoma State
1995 – Oklahoma State

Men's gymnastics (14):
1971 – Iowa State
1973 – Iowa State
1974 – Iowa State
1977 – Oklahoma
1978 – Oklahoma
1979 – Nebraska
1980 – Nebraska
1981 – Nebraska
1982 – Nebraska
1983 – Nebraska
1988 – Nebraska
1990 – Nebraska
1991 – Oklahoma
1994 – Nebraska

Men's/Women's Skiing (14):
1959 – Colorado
1960 – Colorado
1972 – Colorado
1973 – Colorado
1974 – Colorado
1975 – Colorado
1976 – Colorado
1977 – Colorado
1978 – Colorado
1979 – Colorado
1982 – Colorado (men's)
1982 – Colorado (women's)
1991 – Colorado
1995 – Colorado

Men's Indoor Track (4):
1965 – Missouri
1966 – Kansas
1969 – Kansas
1970 – Kansas

Women's Indoor Track (3):
1982 – Nebraska
1983 – Nebraska
1984 – Nebraska

Men's Outdoor Track (3):
1959 – Kansas
1960 – Kansas
1970 – Kansas

Women's volleyball (1):
1995 – Nebraska

Wrestling (27):
1928 – Oklahoma State
1933 – Iowa State
1936 – Oklahoma
1951 – Oklahoma
1952 – Oklahoma
1957 – Oklahoma
1958 – Oklahoma State
1959 – Oklahoma State
1960 – Oklahoma
1961 – Oklahoma State
1962 – Oklahoma State
1963 – Oklahoma
1964 – Oklahoma State
1965 – Iowa State
1966 – Oklahoma State
1968 – Oklahoma State
1969 – Iowa State
1970 – Iowa State
1971 – Oklahoma State
1972 – Iowa State
1973 – Iowa State
1974 – Oklahoma
1977 – Iowa State
1987 – Iowa State
1989 – Oklahoma State
1990 – Oklahoma State
1994 – Oklahoma State

=== National team titles by institution ===
The national championships listed below are for the final eight members of the conference, as of July 2014. Football, Helms, and equestrian titles are included in the total, but excluded from the column listing NCAA and AIAW titles.

Big Eight National Championships
School	Total titles	Titles as a member of the Big Eight	NCAA and AIAW titles	Notes
Oklahoma State	55	21	53	OSU has 1 recognized football title and has 1 overall equestrian title
Oklahoma	44	19	37	OU has 7 recognized football titles
Colorado	30	15	29	CU has 1 recognized football title and 1 AIAW title
Nebraska	27	16	22	NU has 5 recognized football titles and 1 AIAW title
Iowa State	18	18	18	ISU has 5 AIAW titles
Kansas	14	11	12	KU has 2 Helms basketball titles
Missouri	2	2	2	
Kansas State	0	0	0	

== Racial integration ==
The history of the Big Eight Conference straddles the era of racial segregation in the United States, particularly as it relates to African Americans.

Before the formation of the conference, three African-American brothers at the University of Kansas were the first known to have participated in organized sports for a league school: Sherman Haney played baseball for KU beginning in 1888, followed by Grant Haney and then Ed Haney, the last of whom also played football at KU in 1893. At the same time, the University of Nebraska football team had on its roster George Flippin, the son of a slave, beginning in 1891. Nebraska's football team featured three more African-American players over the next 12 years. Notable among these NU players was Clinton Ross, who in 1911 became the first African-American to participate in sport in the MVIAA, following the league's formation in 1907.

Race relations in the United States, however, deteriorated in the early 20th century, and African-American athletes disappeared almost entirely from the conference in the four decades after Ross's final season at NU in 1913. The lone exception during the following decades was Iowa State. In 1923 Jack Trice became the first African-American athlete at Iowa State – and the only one in the conference. Tragically, Trice died two days after playing his second football game with Iowa State, due to injuries suffered during the game (against Minnesota). Jack Trice Stadium at Iowa State is now named in his honor. Trice was followed at Iowa State by Holloway Smith, who played football for ISU in 1926 and 1927. After Smith, the league's teams were all-white for more than two decades. (During this time all of the major professional sports leagues in the U.S. were also segregated.)

=== Modern era ===
The modern era of full integration of league sports began at Kansas State, with Harold Robinson. In 1949, Harold Robinson played football for Kansas State with an athletic scholarship. In doing so, Robinson broke the modern "color barrier" in conference athletics and also became the first-ever African-American athlete on scholarship in the conference. Harold Robinson later received a letter of congratulations from Jackie Robinson, who had reintegrated major league baseball in 1947 while playing with the Brooklyn Dodgers.

In the spring of 1951, the conference's baseball color barrier was broken by Kansas State's Earl Woods, and in the winter of 1951–1952, Kansas State's Gene Wilson and Kansas's LaVannes Squires jointly broke the conference color barrier in basketball.

Nebraska was the third league school to (re)integrate its athletic teams, with Charles Bryant joining the football team in 1952. Iowa State would be next, with Harold Potts and Henry Philmon reintegrating the Cyclone football team in 1953. The following season, Franklin Clarke became the first varsity African-American football player at the University of Colorado. In 1955, Homer Floyd became the first African-American to play football for Kansas since Ed Haney in 1893. Sports teams at the remaining three conference schools (Oklahoma, Missouri and Oklahoma State) were subsequently all integrated by the end of the 1950s. Notably, Prentice Gautt (later a Big Eight administrator) became the first black player for Bud Wilkinson at Oklahoma in 1956, and Norris Stevenson integrated Mizzou athletics in 1957.

Every college football team of the Big Eight was fully integrated by the end of the 1950s, and this gave the conference an advantage throughout the 1960s, as many opposing conferences had not yet integrated their sports teams. The Southeastern Conference (SEC), the last major college sports conference to oppose integration, had particular trouble against the Big Eight during its final years fielding all-white teams. The first SEC school to integrate, Kentucky, did so in 1967, and the last schools to do so, LSU and Mississippi, did so in 1972. During the SEC's eight-year national championship drought between 1965 and 1973, the Big Eight teams repeatedly defeated the SEC teams in inter-conference games, largely due to their integrated teams.

The 1971 football season ended with three Big Eight schools—Nebraska, Oklahoma, and Colorado—ranked first, second, and third in the final AP poll, the only season in college football history that three teams from the same conference finished in the top three rankings. During the 1971 season, those three Big Eight teams beat three SEC schools—Alabama, Auburn, and LSU—in decisive victories (Colorado defeated LSU, 31–21 in September; Nebraska defeated Alabama, 38–6 in the Orange Bowl; Oklahoma defeated Auburn, 40–22 in the Sugar Bowl). In each of the Big Eight victories throughout this period, and especially in the 1971 season, the performance of the Big Eight schools’ black players was considered a deciding factor in their teams' victories. These players' performance contributed to the SEC school's recruitment of black players—the next national championship won by the SEC was by the 1973 Alabama team, which was fully integrated.

== Conference facilities ==
This is a listing of the conference facilities as of the final athletic season of the conference, 1995–1996.

School	Football stadium	Capacity	Basketball arena	Capacity	Baseball stadium	Capacity
Colorado	Folsom Field	51,655	Coors Events Center	11,065	—	—†
Iowa State	Jack Trice Stadium	43,000	Hilton Coliseum	14,356	Cap Timm Field	3,500
Kansas	Memorial Stadium	50,250	Allen Fieldhouse	16,300	Hoglund Ballpark	2,500
Kansas State	KSU Stadium	43,000	Bramlage Coliseum	13,500	Frank Myers Field	2,000
Missouri	Faurot Field	62,023	Hearnes Center	13,611	Simmons Field	2,000
Nebraska	Memorial Stadium	76,500	Bob Devaney Sports Center	13,000	Buck Beltzer Stadium	1,500
Oklahoma	Owen Field	74,897	Lloyd Noble Center	11,528	L. Dale Mitchell Baseball Park	2,700
Oklahoma State	Lewis Field	55,509	Gallagher-Iba Arena	6,381	Allie P. Reynolds Stadium	3,821

† The Colorado Buffaloes baseball program, which played home games at Prentup Field, was discontinued in June 1980.

== See also ==
- List of Big Eight Conference champions
