= List of Oklahoma Sooners football All-Americans =

This is a list of Oklahoma Sooners college football players who were named first team All-Americans. The selecting organizations for football All-Americans that the NCAA recognizes include the Associated Press, American Football Coaches Association, Football Writers Association of America, The Sporting News, and the Walter Camp Football Foundation. The NCAA defines consensus All-Americans as players who were accorded a majority of votes at their positions by these selectors. Unanimous All-Americans are players who were selected by all five selectors.

Oklahoma has had 169 first team All-Americans in its history. 83 of these were consensus, and 35 were unanimous. OU has the most unanimous All-Americans in the history of college football and the most consensus All-Americans since World War II.

== All-Americans ==
Year	Name	Position	Consensus	Unanimous	Sources
1913	Claude Reeds	Fullback	—	—	
1915	Forest Geyer	Fullback	—	—	
1920	Phil White	Halfback	—	—	
1920	Roy Smoot	Offensive tackle	—	—	
1927	Granville Norris	Fullback	—	—	
1934	Cassius Gentry	Offensive tackle	—	—	
1935	J. W. "Dub" Wheeler	Offensive tackle	—	—	
1937	Pete Smith	End	—	—	
1938	Waddy Young	End	Yes	—	
1939	Pop Ivy	End	—	—	
1939	Gilford Duggan	Offensive tackle	—	—	
1946	Buddy Burris	Guard	—	—	
1946	Plato Andros	Guard	—	—	
1946	John Rapacz	Center	—	—	
1947	Buddy Burris	Guard	—	—	
1948	Buddy Burris	Guard	Yes	—	
1948	Jack Mitchell	Quarterback	—	—	
1949	Wade Walker	Offensive tackle	—	—	
1949	Stanley West	Guard	—	—	
1949	Darrell Royal	Quarterback	—	—	
1949	Jim Owens	End	—	—	
1949	George Thomas	Halfback	—	—	
1950	Leon Heath	Fullback	Yes	—	
1950	Jim Weatherall	Offensive tackle	Yes	—	
1950	Buddy Jones	Safety	—	—	
1950	Frankie Anderson	End	—	—	
1951	Jim Weatherall	Offensive tackle	Yes	Yes	
1951	Tom Catlin	Center	—	—	
1952	Tom Catlin	Center	—	—	
1952	Eddie Crowder	Quarterback	—	—	
1952	Billy Vessels	Halfback	Yes	—	
1952	Buck McPhail	Fullback	—	—	
1953	J. D. Roberts	Guard	Yes	—	
1954	Kurt Burris	Center	Yes	—	
1954	Max Boydston	End	Yes	—	
1955	Bo Bolinger	Guard	Yes	—	
1955	Tommy McDonald	Halfback	—	—	
1956	Jerry Tubbs	Center	Yes	Yes	
1956	Bill Krisher	Guard	—	—	
1956	Tommy McDonald	Halfback	Yes	—	
1956	Ed Gray	Guard	—	—	
1957	Clendon Thomas	Halfback	Yes	—	
1957	Bill Krisher	Guard	Yes	—	
1958	Bob Harrison	Center	Yes	—	
1959	Jerry Thompson	Guard	—	—	
1962	Leon Cross	Guard	—	—	
1962	Wayne Lee	Center	—	—	
1962	Joe Don Looney	Halfback	—	—	
1963	Jim Grisham	Fullback	Yes	—	
1963	Ralph Neely	Offensive tackle	—	—	
1964	Carl McAdams	Linebacker	—	—	
1964	Ralph Neely	Offensive tackle	Yes	—	
1965	Carl McAdams	Linebacker	Yes	—	
1966	Granville Liggins	Nose guard	—	—	
1967	Granville Liggins	Nose guard	Yes	Yes	
1967	Bob Kalsu	Offensive tackle	—	—	
1968	Steve Owens	Halfback	—	—	
1969	Steve Zabel	Tight end	—	—	
1969	Steve Owens	Halfback	Yes	Yes	
1969	Ken Mendenhall	Center	—	—	
1971	Jack Mildren	Quarterback	—	—	
1971	Tom Brahaney	Center	Yes	—	
1971	Greg Pruitt	Halfback	Yes	Yes	
1972	Tom Brahaney	Center	Yes	—	
1972	Rod Shoate	Linebacker	—	—	
1972	Greg Pruitt	Halfback	Yes	Yes	
1972	Derland Moore	Offensive tackle	—	—	
1973	Rod Shoate	Linebacker	Yes	—	
1973	Eddie Foster	Offensive tackle	—	—	
1973	Lucious Selmon	Nose guard	Yes	Yes	
1974	Rod Shoate	Linebacker	Yes	Yes	
1974	Lee Roy Selmon	Defensive tackle	—	—	
1974	Dewey Selmon	Nose guard	—	—	
1974	Tinker Owens	Wide receiver	—	—	
1974	John Roush	Guard	Yes	—	
1974	Randy Hughes	Defensive back	—	—	
1974	Kyle Davis	Center	—	—	
1974	Joe Washington	Halfback	Yes	Yes	
1975	Lee Roy Selmon	Defensive tackle	Yes	Yes	
1975	Dewey Selmon	Nose guard	Yes	—	
1975	Terry Webb	Guard	—	—	
1975	Mike Vaughan	Offensive tackle	—	—	
1975	Billy Brooks	Wide receiver	—	—	
1975	Jimbo Elrod	Defensive end	Yes	—	
1975	Tinker Owens	Wide receiver	—	—	
1975	Joe Washington	Halfback	—	—	
1976	Mike Vaughan	Offensive tackle	Yes	Yes	
1976	Zac Henderson	Defensive back	—	—	
1977	Zac Henderson	Defensive back	Yes	Yes	
1977	George Cumby	Linebacker	—	—	
1977	Daryl Hunt	Linebacker	—	—	
1977	Greg Roberts	Guard	—	—	
1977	Reggie Kinlaw	Nose guard	—	—	
1978	Greg Roberts	Guard	Yes	Yes	
1978	Billy Sims	Halfback	Yes	Yes	
1978	Reggie Kinlaw	Nose guard	—	—	
1978	Daryl Hunt	Linebacker	—	—	
1979	George Cumby	Linebacker	Yes	Yes	
1979	Billy Sims	Halfback	Yes	Yes	
1980	Terry Crouch	Guard	—	—	
1980	Louis Oubre	Offensive tackle	Yes	—	
1981	Terry Crouch	Guard	Yes	—	
1982	Rick Bryan	Defensive tackle	Yes	—	
1983	Rick Bryan	Defensive tackle	Yes	Yes	
1984	Tony Casillas	Nose guard	Yes	—	
1985	Tony Casillas	Nose guard	Yes	—	
1985	Brian Bosworth	Linebacker	Yes	Yes	
1985	Kevin Murphy	Defensive end	—	—	
1986	Brian Bosworth	Linebacker	Yes	Yes	
1986	Mark Hutson	Guard	—	—	
1986	Keith Jackson	Tight end	Yes	Yes	
1986	Anthony Phillips	Guard	—	—	
1987	Keith Jackson	Tight end	Yes	Yes	
1987	Mark Hutson	Guard	Yes	Yes	
1987	Rickey Dixon	Defensive back	Yes	—	
1987	Dante Jones	Linebacker	Yes	—	
1987	Darrell Reed	Defensive end	—	—	
1988	Anthony Phillips	Guard	Yes	Yes	
1991	Joe Bowden	Linebacker	—	—	
1995	Cedric Jones	Defensive end	—	—	
2000	Rocky Calmus	Linebacker	Yes	—	
2000	Josh Heupel	Quarterback	Yes	—	
2000	J. T. Thatcher	Safety	Yes	—	
2001	Rocky Calmus	Linebacker	Yes	—	
2001	Jeff Ferguson	Punter	—	—	
2001	Roy Williams	Safety	Yes	Yes	
2002	Brandon Everage	Safety	—	—	
2002	Tommie Harris	Defensive tackle	Yes	—	
2002	Teddy Lehman	Linebacker	Yes	—	
2003	Jammal Brown	Offensive tackle	—	—	
2003	Mark Clayton	Wide receiver	—	—	
2003	Tommie Harris	Defensive tackle	Yes	Yes	
2003	Teddy Lehman	Linebacker	Yes	Yes	
2003	Antonio Perkins	Return specialist	Yes	Yes	
2003	Derrick Strait	Cornerback	Yes	Yes	
2003	Jason White	Quarterback	Yes	Yes	
2004	Jammal Brown	Offensive tackle	Yes	Yes	
2004	Mark Clayton	Wide receiver	—	—	
2004	Vince Carter	Center	—	—	
2004	Dan Cody	Defensive end	—	—	
2004	Adrian Peterson	Running back	Yes	Yes	
2006	Rufus Alexander	Linebacker	—	—	
2007	Duke Robinson	Offensive line	Yes	—	
2007	Curtis Lofton	Linebacker	Yes	—	
2008	Duke Robinson	Offensive line	Yes	—	
2008	Sam Bradford	Quarterback	Yes	—	
2008	Jermaine Gresham	Tight end	—	—	
2008	Gerald McCoy	Defensive tackle	—	—	
2009	Trent Williams	Offensive line	Yes	—	
2009	Gerald McCoy	Defensive tackle	Yes	—	
2010	Quinton Carter	Safety	Yes	—	
2010	Ryan Broyles	Wide receiver	Yes	—	
2011	Ryan Broyles	Wide receiver	Yes	—	
2013	Gabe Ikard	Center	Yes	—	
2015	Baker Mayfield	Quarterback	—	—	
2015	Eric Striker	Linebacker	—	—	
2016	Dede Westbrook	Wide receiver	Yes	Yes	
2017	Baker Mayfield	Quarterback	Yes	Yes	
2017	Orlando Brown Jr.	Offensive line	Yes	Yes	
2017	Mark Andrews	Tight end	Yes	Yes	
2017	Ogbonnia Okoronkwo	Linebacker	—	—	
2018	Ben Powers	Offensive line	Yes	—	
2018	Kyler Murray	Quarterback	—	—	
2018	Marquise Brown	Wide receiver	—	—	
2018	Dru Samia	Offensive line	—	—	
2019	CeeDee Lamb	Wide receiver	Yes	—	
2024	Danny Stutsman	Linebacker	Yes	—	
2025	Tate Sandell	Placekicker	—	—	
