= 1975 New Orleans Saints season =

NFL team season

- Owner: John W. Mecom Jr.
- Head coach: John North; Ernie Hefferle (interim)
- Home stadium: Louisiana Superdome

Results
- Record: 2–12
- Division place: 4th NFC West
- Playoffs: Did not qualify
- Pro Bowlers: None

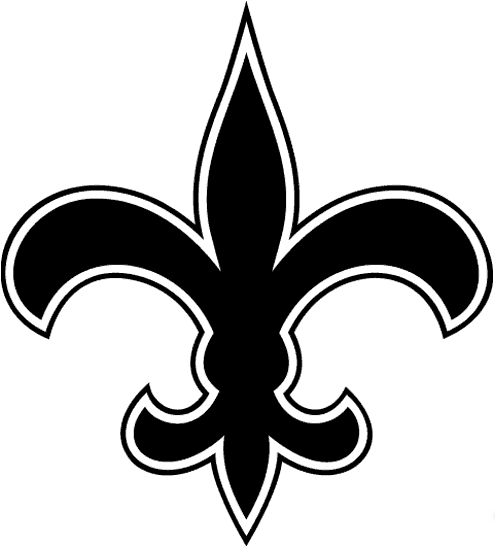
New Orleans Saints' Fleur-de-lis logo from 1967 to 1999

The 1975 New Orleans Saints season was the Saints ninth season and their first in the newly opened Louisiana Superdome. Despite the new stadium, they failed to match their 1974 output of 5–9, winning only two games and tying the San Diego Chargers for the league’s worst record.

Coach John North, who was hired four games into the 1973 exhibition season, was fired following a 38–14 road loss to the Los Angeles Rams in the sixth game. Director of Player Personnel Ernie Hefferle took over for the final eight games. His only win was his first game in charge, a 23–7 victory at home over the hated Atlanta Falcons.

The Saints were winless on the road for the fourth time in six seasons, leaving them 3–36–3 away from New Orleans since 1970.

The Saints wore white pants for the first time after wearing old gold pants for their first eight seasons. After 1975, New Orleans did not wear white jerseys and white pants again until introducing their Color Rush set in 2016.

== Offseason ==
=== NFL draft ===
1975 New Orleans Saints draft
Round	Pick	Player	Position	College	Notes
1	7	Larry Burton	Wide receiver	Purdue	
1	12	Kurt Schumacher	Guard	Ohio State	
2	32	Lee Gross	Center	Auburn	
3	60	Andrew Jones	Running back	Washington State	
3	63	Elois Grooms	Defensive end	Tennessee Tech	
4	92	John Starkebaum	Defensive back	Nebraska	
4	99	Charlie Hall	Defensive end	Tulane	
6	149	Mike Lemon	Linebacker	Kansas	
7	163	Steve Rogers	Running back	Louisiana State	
9	216	Mike Strachan	Running back	Iowa State	
10	243	Chuck Heater	Running back	Michigan	
11	266	Danny Lee	Punter	N.E. Louisiana	
12	294	Ron Gustafson	Wide receiver	North Dakota	
13	319	Jim Upchurch	Punter	Arizona	
14	344	Randy Rhino	Defensive back	Georgia Tech	
15	372	Grant Burget	Running back	Oklahoma	
16	397	Mike McDonald	Linebacker	Catawba	
17	422	Greg Westbrooks	Linebacker	Colorado	
Made roster

== Personnel ==
=== Staff ===
1975 New Orleans Saints staff
Front office: President – John W. Mecom Jr.; Executive Vice President – Richard F. Gordon, Jr.; Vice President of Administration – Harry Hulmes; Business Manager and Treasurer – Eddie Jones; Head coaches: Head coach – John North (games 1-6; fired October 27); Head coach - Ernie Hefferle (games 7-14); Offensive coaches: Quarterbacks – Lamar McHan; Offensive Backs – Bob Ledbetter; Receivers – Jim Phillips; Offensive Line – Wimp Hewgley	Defensive coaches: Defensive Line – Bob Cummings; Linebackers – Doug Shively; Defensive Backfield – Bud Whitehead; Special teams coaches: Special Teams – Billy Ray Barnes

=== Roster ===
1975 New Orleans Saints roster
Quarterbacks (QB): 13 Larry Cipa; 8 Archie Manning; 12 Bobby Scott; Running backs (RB): 36 Andrew Jones; 36 Morris LaGrand; 28 Alvin Maxson; 27 Rod McNeill; 26 Steve Rogers; Wide receivers (WR): 80 Larry Burton; 87 Don Herrmann; Tight ends (TE): 85 Henry Childs; 84 Paul Seal	Offensive linemen (OL): 79 Emanuel Zanders G; 56 Lee Gross C; 62 John Hill C; 50 Jake Kupp G; 67 Phil LaPorta T; 77 Chris Morris T; 76 Don Morrison T; 71 Kurt Schumacher G; Defensive linemen (DL): 63 Steve Baumgartner DE; 69 Andy Dorris DE; 74 Derland Moore DT; 72 Joe Owens DE; 82 Bob Pollard DE; 75 Elex Price DT	Linebackers (LB): 51 Rusty Chambers OLB; 55 Don Coleman OLB; 58 Joe Federspiel MLB; 53 Rick Kingrea OLB; 54 Rick Middleton OLB; 60 Greg Westbrooks OLB; Defensive backs (DB): 44 Chuck Crist FS; 24 Johnny Fuller SS; 30 Ernie Jackson CB; 11 Bivian Lee CB; 37 Tom Myers FS; 44 Terry Schmidt CB; 29 Mo Spencer CB; Special teams (ST): 16 Tom Blanchard P; 15 Rich Szaro K	Reserve: 89 Gil Chapman WR (IR); 59 Wayne Colman LB (IR); 86 Dave Davis WR (IR); 78 Elois Grooms DE (IR); 83 Andy Hamilton WR (IR); 57 Jim Merlo LB (IR); 88 Joel Parker WR (IR); 48 John Starkebaum S (IR); 33 Mike Strachan RB (IR); 65 Dave Thompson T (IR); 66 Tom Wickert G/T (IR); Rookies in italics

== Regular season ==
=== Schedule ===
Week	Date	Opponent	Result	Record	Venue	Attendance
1	September 21	at Washington Redskins	**L** 3–41	0–1	RFK Stadium	54,414
2	September 28	Cincinnati Bengals	**L** 0–21	0–2	Louisiana Superdome	52,531
3	October 5	at **Atlanta Falcons**	**L** 7–14	0–3	Atlanta–Fulton County Stadium	29,444
4	October 12	Green Bay Packers	**W** 20–19	1–3	Louisiana Superdome	51,371
5	October 19	at **San Francisco 49ers**	**L** 21–35	1–4	Candlestick Park	39,990
6	October 26	at **Los Angeles Rams**	**L** 14–38	1–5	Los Angeles Memorial Coliseum	54,723
7	November 2	**Atlanta Falcons**	**W** 23–7	2–5	Louisiana Superdome	49,342
8	November 9	at Oakland Raiders	**L** 10–48	2–6	Oakland–Alameda County Coliseum	51,267
9	November 16	Minnesota Vikings	**L** 7–20	2–7	Louisiana Superdome	52,765
10	November 23	San Francisco 49ers	**L** 6–16	2–8	Louisiana Superdome	40,328
11	November 30	at Cleveland Browns	**L** 16–17	2–9	Cleveland Municipal Stadium	44,753
12	December 7	Los Angeles Rams	**L** 7–14	2–10	Louisiana Superdome	39,958
13	December 14	at New York Giants	**L** 14–28	2–11	Shea Stadium	40,150
14	December 21	Chicago Bears	**L** 17–42	2–12	Louisiana Superdome	33,371
Note: Intra-division opponents are in **bold** text.

=== Standings ===
NFC West
	W	L	T	PCT	DIV	CONF	PF	PA	STK
Los Angeles Rams^{(2)}	12	2	0	.857	5–1	9–2	312	135	W6
San Francisco 49ers	5	9	0	.357	3–3	4–7	255	286	L4
Atlanta Falcons	4	10	0	.286	3–3	3–8	240	289	L1
New Orleans Saints	2	12	0	.143	1–5	2–9	165	360	L7
