= Ralph Ortega =

American football player (born 1953)

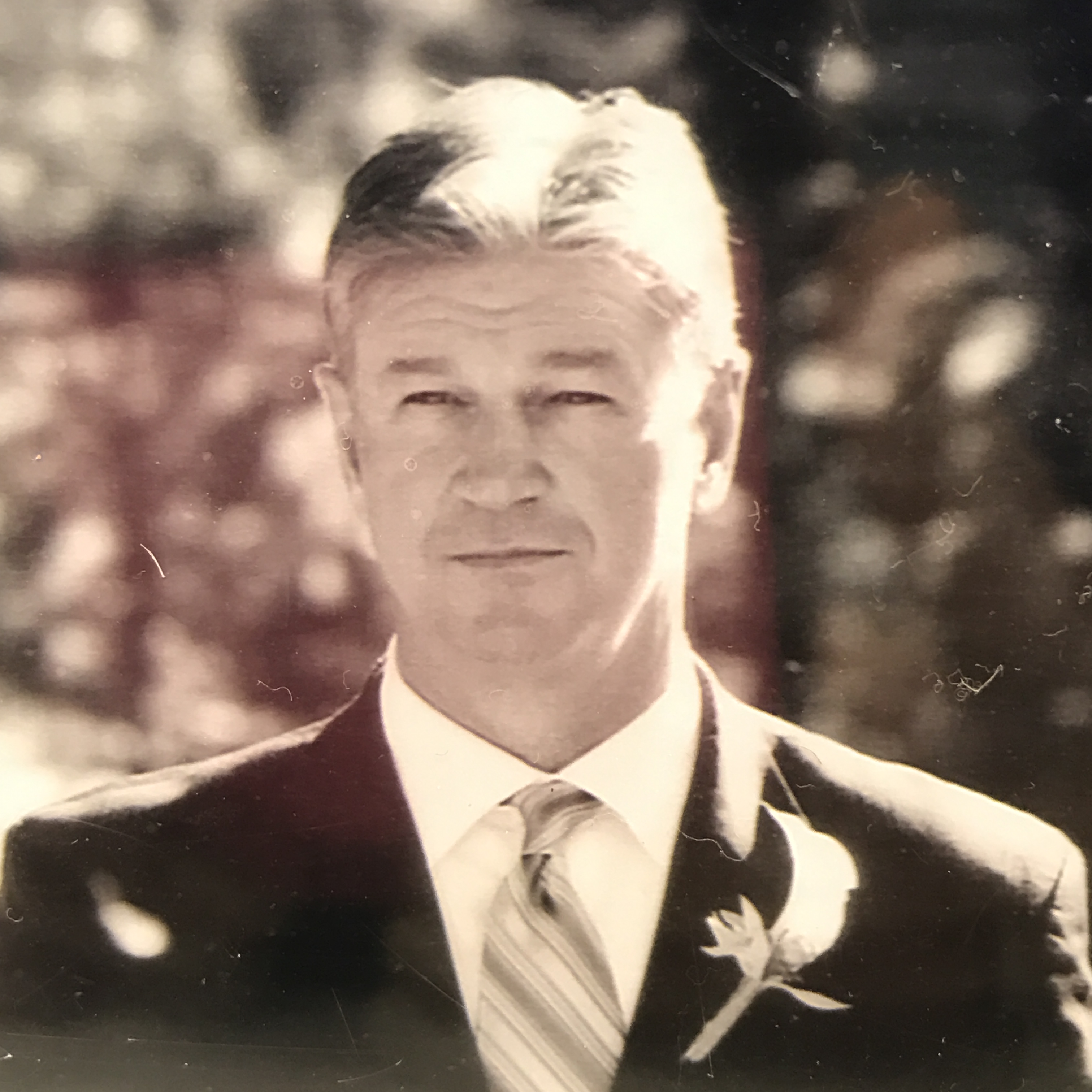
- Ortega in 2006

No. 55, 54
- Position: Linebacker

Personal information
- Born: July 6, 1953 (age 73); Havana, Cuba
- Listed height: 6 ft 2 in (1.88 m)
- Listed weight: 220 lb (100 kg)

Career information
- High school: Coral Gables Senior (Coral Gables, Florida, U.S.)
- College: Florida
- NFL draft: 1975: 2nd round, 29th overall pick

Career history
- Atlanta Falcons (1975–1978); Miami Dolphins (1979–1980)

Awards and highlights
- First-team All-American (1974); 2× First-team All-SEC (1973, 1974); University of Florida Athletic Hall of Fame

Career NFL statistics
- Games played: 81
- Games started: 10
- Interceptions: 5
- Fumbles recovered: 7
- Touchdowns: 1
- Stats at Pro Football Reference

Ralph Ortega (born July 6, 1953) is an American former professional football player who was a linebacker for six seasons in the National Football League (NFL) during the 1970s and early 1980s. Ortega played college football for the Florida Gators, earning first-team All-American honors in 1974. A second-round pick in the 1975 NFL draft, he played in the NFL for the Atlanta Falcons and Miami Dolphins.

== Early life ==
Ortega was born in Havana, Cuba in 1953, but moved to Miami, Florida with his family when he was a child. Ortega played high school football for legendary coach Nick Kotys at Coral Gables Senior High School in Coral Gables, Florida, and was a shot-put specialist on the track and field team. Two of his Coral Gables Cavaliers football teammates, defensive back Neal Colzie and fullback-linebacker Glenn Cameron, were first-round 1975 NFL draft picks of the Oakland Raiders and Cincinnati Bengals, respectively.

In 2007, thirty-six years after he graduated from high school, the Florida High School Athletic Association (FHSAA) recognized Ortega as one of the "100 Greatest Players of the First 100 Years" of Florida high school football.

== College career ==
Ortega accepted an athletic scholarship to attend the University of Florida in Gainesville, Florida, where he played linebacker for head coach Doug Dickey's Florida Gators football team from 1971 to 1974. Memorably, in 1973, he helped the Gators beat the Auburn Tigers for the first time at Jordan–Hare Stadium in fourteen visits. Ortega's big play was a crushing tackle that caused a fumble by Auburn tailback Chris Linderman inside the Gators' five yard-line shortly before halftime. The Gators won 12–8, with Auburn's only points coming near the end of the game. The Gators' coach, Doug Dickey, was carried from the field by his players after the game. At the time, it was called "one of the greatest moments in Florida Gators football history."

Ortega finished his four-season college career with 357 tackles, twelve forced fumbles (eight recovered), and five interceptions. He was a first-team All-Southeastern Conference (SEC) selection in 1973 and 1974, a first-team All-American in 1974, an Academic All-American, and the team captain during his senior year. He graduated from Florida with a bachelor's degree in management in 1976, and was inducted into the University of Florida Athletic Hall of Fame as a "Gator Great" in 1978. In a 2006 article series written for The Gainesville Sun, the Sun sports editors recognized him as No. 40 among the top 100 players of the first century of Florida Gators football.

== Professional career ==
Ortega enjoyed a six-year professional football career in the NFL. He was chosen in the second round (29th overall) of the 1975 NFL Draft by the Atlanta Falcons. He was a starting linebacker in 1977, and a key component of the renowned "Grits Blitz" Falcons defense, before being relegated to special teams in 1978. He was traded to the Miami Dolphins for a future third-round draft pick in 1979. He finished his NFL career with the Dolphins in 1980. During his six NFL seasons, Ortega played in eighty-one regular season games, intercepted five passes and recovered seven fumbles.

== Life after the NFL ==
Ortega still lives in Miami.

Ortega's son, Buck Ortega, played college football for the Miami Hurricanes as a quarterback and tight end from 2001 to 2004, after winning the Florida Class 2A state high school football championship as the quarterback for Gulliver Preparatory School in 2000. Ortega served as an assistant coach for his son's Gulliver Prep team, and had a close mentor relationship with future NFL star defensive back Sean Taylor, one of his son's Gulliver Prep teammates and close friends.

His son Buck went on to play in the NFL as well. Most notably, Buck played on the New Orleans Saints in 2010, the year they won the Super Bowl.

His twin daughters, Jacqueline and Jennifer, played Division One volleyball at Davidson College.

== See also ==
- 1974 College Football All-America Team
- Florida Gators football, 1970–79
- History of the Atlanta Falcons
- List of Florida Gators football All-Americans
- List of Florida Gators in the NFL draft
- List of Miami Dolphins players
- List of University of Florida alumni
- List of University of Florida Athletic Hall of Fame members
