= Eufaula High School =

Eufaula High School can refer to

- Eufaula High School (Eufaula, Alabama)
- Eufaula High School (Eufaula, Oklahoma)
