= John Provost =

American football player (born 1953)

Profile
- Position: Defensive back

Personal information
- Born: February 9, 1953 (age 73)

Career information
- College: College of the Holy Cross

Career history
- 1974: Holy Cross Crusaders

Awards and highlights
- Consensus All-American (1974); Third-team All-American (1972); 3× First-team All-East (1972, 1973, 1974)

John S. Provost (born February 9, 1953) is an American former football player. He played college football at the defensive back position for College of the Holy Cross and was a consensus first-team selection to the 1974 College Football All-America Team. He also returned punts for Holy Cross and averaged 18.3 yards per punt in 1974. In a game against Brown in September 1974, he returned two punts for touchdowns (returns of 85 and 59 yards) and also intercepted four passes. At the end of the 1974 season, he was also selected by the United Press as the New England Major College Player of the Year and by the New England College Coaches as the most outstanding football player in New England. He totaled 10 interceptions in 1974 and 27 in his career and set a career NCAA record with 470 interception return yards. Provost was inducted into the Holy Cross Crusader Football Legends Ring of Fame in 2010.

== See also ==
- List of NCAA major college football yearly punt and kickoff return leaders
