= Marvin Crenshaw =

American football player (born 1952)

No. 73
- Position: Offensive tackle

Personal information
- Born: February 3, 1952 (age 74); Toledo, Ohio, U.S.
- Listed height: 6 ft 6 in (1.98 m)
- Listed weight: 240 lb (109 kg)

Career information
- High school: Woodward (Toledo)
- College: Nebraska (1971–1974)
- NFL draft: 1975: 6th round, 156th overall pick

Career history
- Pittsburgh Steelers (1975)*; New York Jets (1975)*; Toronto Argonauts (1976)*; Los Angeles Rams (1976)*
- * Offseason or practice squad member only

Awards and highlights
- Consensus All-American (1974); First-team All-Big Eight (1974)

Marvin Crenshaw (born February 3, 1952) is an American former football offensive tackle. He played college football at the University of Nebraska–Lincoln, and was a consensus All-American in 1974. He was selected by the Pittsburgh Steelers in the sixth round of the 1975 NFL draft.

== Early life and college ==
Marvin Crenshaw was born on February 3, 1952, in Toledo, Ohio. He attended Woodward High School in Toledo, where he was named All-City and All-City Academic in football and basketball.

Crenshaw was a member of the Nebraska Cornhuskers of the University of Nebraska–Lincoln from 1971 to 1974 and a three-year letterman from 1972 to 1974. He was a consensus All-American in 1974. He was also named first-team All-Big Eight in 1974. Crenshaw was inducted into the Nebraska Football Hall of Fame in 2003.

== Professional career ==
Crenshaw was selected by the Pittsburgh Steelers in the sixth round, with the 156th overall pick, of the 1975 NFL draft. On July 25, 1975, it was reported that he had been released by the Steelers after a contract dispute.

Crenshaw was then claimed off waivers by the New York Jets. He was released by the Jets on August 12, 1975.

Crenshaw signed with the Toronto Argonauts of the Canadian Football League in 1976 but was later released.

Crenshaw was signed by the Los Angeles Rams in 1976. He was released on August 3, 1976.

== Personal life ==
While at the University of Nebraska–Lincoln, Crenshaw served as a police officer during the summer.
