= East Central High School (Oklahoma) =

Location
- 12150 E 11 St; Tulsa, Oklahoma 74128; United States; 36.146133°N 95.839884°W

Information
- Type: Public
- Established: 1927
- School district: Tulsa Public Schools
- Staff: 53.78 (FTE)
- Grades: 9-12
- Enrollment: 1,189 (2023–2024)
- Student to teacher ratio: 22.11
- Colors: Red, black, and white
- Mascot: Fighting Cardinal
- Website: eastcentral.tulsaschools.org

East Central High School is one of nine high schools in Tulsa Public Schools in Tulsa, Oklahoma, United States. It enrolls 1,143 students from East Tulsa. The majority of students transition into East Central from East Central Junior High.

== History ==
East Central was founded in 1904 as an independent school district. The original combined school was built on the northeast corner of what is now Admiral Blvd. and Garnett Road in 1927. It supported an elementary school, a junior high school, and high school. With the growth of the East Central district, the school built an expansion to house the High School in 1955, and built a new elementary school on East 6th Street that was completed in November 1958.

In 1960, considerable damage was done by high wind to the high school facility at the Admiral Blvd location, and the start of school was delayed a week.

In the summer of 1964, the people of the district voted to be annexed into the Tulsa Public Schools starting that school year ('64/'65).

The current school facility opened in 1966 on East 11th Street, with addition of an athletic stadium in 1997. The architect of the landmark Rose Bowl bowling alley on 11th Street (old Route 66), William Henry Ryan, also designed East Central High School.

Beginning in the 2009–2010 school year, uniforms have been required for freshman students for the first time in the school and district history.

== Music program ==
School Superintendent William Wickett hired Frank McPeters to start the school's first band program in 1951. Within a few years, the ECHS Band was performing at a high level at school concerts, area parades and ECHS football games. "Mister Mac" was loved by his students, and was known for his ability to motivate young people to become high achievers. He was an outstanding musician, serving as the principal trombonist for the Tulsa Philharmonic Orchestra for over 30 years. McPeters was inducted into the East Central High School Hall of Fame in the 1990s.

== Athletics ==
East Central sports include soccer, football, basketball, tennis, golf, baseball, track, and wrestling.

East Central competes in Oklahoma 5A athletics. Sports teams compete as the East Central Fighting Cardinals. (The football team is also known as the Sharks.) In the 2005–2006 school year, the football team, girls' basketball team, and girls' track team won the state 5A title in their respective sports. The East Central girls' basketball team won consecutive State 5A titles in 2006 and 2007. The girls' track team won two more consecutive titles in the school years 2006–2007 and 2007–2008, for a total of three. The boys' track team also won the 5A State title in 2008 and in 2011.

== Notable alumni ==
- Anthony Bowie - 1982, NBA basketball player
- Mark Calvert - 1974, MLB baseball player, San Francisco Giants (1983–1984)
- Tony Casillas - 1981, NFL football player and broadcaster
- Jimbo Elrod - 1972, NFL football player linebacker, Kansas City Chiefs (1976–1978), Houston Oilers (1979)
- Gerald Harris - 1998, UFC mixed martial arts fighter
- Jim Shoulders - 1945, professional rodeo cowboy
- Paula Trickey - 1984, film and television actress

== In popular media ==
East Central High School has been featured on TruTV's The Principal's Office.
