= Doug Payton =

American gridiron football player (born 1952)

Profile
- Position: Offensive tackle

Personal information
- Born: July 22, 1952 (age 74); Fort Knox, Kentucky, U.S.
- Listed height: 6 ft 3 in (1.91 m)
- Listed weight: 260 lb (118 kg)

Career information
- College: Colorado
- NFL draft: 1975: 6th round, 133rd overall pick

Career history
- 1978–1981: Montreal Alouettes
- 1982: Montreal Concordes
- 1984: Denver Gold

Awards and highlights
- CFL East All-Star (1980); First-team All-Big Eight (1973); Second-team All-Big Eight (1974)

Douglas Dwight Payton (born July 22, 1952) is an American former gridiron football player who played professionally for the Montreal Alouettes, Montreal Concordes and Denver Gold.
