= Al Krevis =

American football player (born 1952)

No. 75, 71
- Position: Tackle

Personal information
- Born: July 9, 1952 (age 74); Providence, Rhode Island, U.S.
- Listed height: 6 ft 5 in (1.96 m)
- Listed weight: 263 lb (119 kg)

Career information
- High school: Morris Catholic (NJ)
- College: Boston College
- NFL draft: 1975: 2nd round, 39th overall pick

Career history
- Cincinnati Bengals (1975); New York Jets (1976)

Awards and highlights
- First-team All-American (1974); 2× First-team All-East (1973, 1974)

Career NFL statistics
- Games played: 13
- Games started: 0
- Stats at Pro Football Reference

Albert Raymond Krevis (born July 9, 1952) is an American former professional football player who was an offensive tackle in the National Football League (NFL). He played college football for the Boston College Eagles, earning All-American, All-East, and All-New England honors twice. Krevis played in 13 NFL games; ten for the New York Jets and three for the Cincinnati Bengals.

== Early life ==
Krevis was born in Providence, Rhode Island. Raised in the Lake Hiawatha section of Parsippany–Troy Hills, New Jersey, Krevis attended Morris Catholic High School in Denville Township, New Jersey followed by Boston College. Krevis statistically only showed his talent in college.

== Football career ==
While playing for the Boston College Eagles football team, Krevis lettered. He was selected by the Cincinnati Bengals in the second round, 39th overall in the 1975 NFL draft, and played three games for them. In 1976, he played ten games for New York Jets.

== Later life ==
In 1991, he was inducted into the Boston College Varsity Club Athletic Hall of Fame.
