= Craig Hertwig =

American football player (1952–2012)

No. 71
- Position: Offensive tackle

Personal information
- Born: January 15, 1952; Columbus, Georgia, U.S.
- Died: May 30, 2012 (aged 60); Athens, Georgia, U.S.
- Listed height: 6 ft 8 in (2.03 m)
- Listed weight: 270 lb (122 kg)

Career information
- High school: Mark Smith (Macon, Georgia)
- College: Georgia (1971–1974)
- NFL draft: 1975: 4th round, 94th overall pick

Career history
- Detroit Lions (1975–1977); Buffalo Bills (1978)

Awards and highlights
- First-team All-American (1974); First-team All-SEC (1974)
- Stats at Pro Football Reference

John Craig "Sky" Hertwig (January 15, 1952 – May 30, 2012) was an American professional football offensive tackle who played three seasons with the Detroit Lions of the National Football League (NFL). He was selected by the Lions in the fourth round of the 1975 NFL draft after playing college football at the University of Georgia. Hertwig was also a member of the Buffalo Bills.

== Early life and college ==
John Craig Hertwig was born on January 15, 1952, in Columbus, Georgia. He attended Mark Smith High School in Macon, Georgia.

Hertwig was a member of the Georgia Bulldogs from 1971 to 1974 and a three-year letterman from 1972 to 1974. As a senior in 1974, he was named a first-team All-American by the Associated Press (AP) and a second-team All-American by the Newspaper Enterprise Association. He earned AP and United Press International first-team All-SEC honors that year as well.

== Professional career ==
Hertwig was selected by the Detroit Lions in the fourth round, with the 94th overall pick, of the 1975 NFL draft. He played in nine games, starting one, for the team during the 1975 season. He appeared in all 14 games, starting eight, in 1976 and recovered one fumble. Hertwig started all 14 games for the Lions in 1977. The Lions finished the season with a 6–8 record. He was released on August 29, 1978.

Hertwig signed with the Buffalo Bills on December 13, 1978. He was released on August 21, 1979.

== Personal life ==
Hertwig died of heart failure on May 30, 2012, in Athens, Georgia. He owned Nowhere Bar in Athens for 32 years up to his death. Hertwig was nicknamed "Sky" in reference to his height.
