= Mike Williams (cornerback) =

American football player (born 1953)

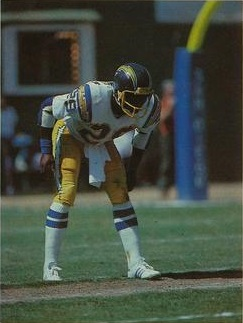
- Williams c. 1980

No. 20, 29, 28
- Position: Cornerback

Personal information
- Born: November 22, 1953 (age 72); New Orleans, Louisiana, U.S.
- Listed height: 5 ft 10 in (1.78 m)
- Listed weight: 181 lb (82 kg)

Career information
- High school: Covington (Covington, Louisiana)
- College: LSU
- NFL draft: 1975: 1st round, 22nd overall pick

Career history
- San Diego Chargers (1975–1982); Los Angeles Rams (1983)

Awards and highlights
- First-team All-American (1974); 3× Second-team All-SEC (1972, 1973, 1974)

Career NFL statistics
- Games played: 109
- Interceptions: 24
- INT yards: 269
- Fumble recoveries: 6
- Stats at Pro Football Reference

Mikell Herman Williams (born November 22, 1953) is an American former professional football player who was a cornerback in the National Football League (NFL), primarily with the San Diego Chargers. He was selected by the Chargers in the first round of the 1975 NFL draft with the 22nd overall pick. Born in New Orleans, he played college football for the LSU Tigers, earning first-team All-American honors in 1974.

With the Chargers in 1979, Williams had four interceptions and did not surrender a touchdown. Opponents avoided passing near him, and instead targeted San Diego's left cornerback, Willie Buchanon, who was an All-Pro a year earlier with Green Bay. Williams was hobbled by injuries in 1981, when the Chargers' secondary was much maligned. He played in two games for the Los Angeles Rams in his final season in 1983.
