= Jimmy Webb (American football) =

American football player (born 1952)

No. 74, 61
- Positions: Defensive tackle, defensive end

Personal information
- Born: April 13, 1952 (age 74); Jackson, Mississippi, U.S.
- Listed height: 6 ft 5 in (1.96 m)
- Listed weight: 247 lb (112 kg)

Career information
- High school: Florence (MS)
- College: Mississippi State
- NFL draft: 1975: 1st round, 10th overall pick

Career history
- San Francisco 49ers (1975–1980); San Diego Chargers (1981)

Awards and highlights
- Consensus All-American (1974); 2× First-team All-SEC (1973, 1974)

Career NFL statistics
- Sacks: 28
- Fumble recoveries: 6
- Stats at Pro Football Reference

James Rogers Webb (born April 13, 1952) is an American former professional football player who was a defensive lineman for seven seasons in the National Football League (NFL).

== Football career ==
Webb grew up playing football in central Mississippi, and played in college for the Mississippi State Bulldogs football team from 1972 to 1974. By his senior season, he was named an All-American on the defensive line.

Webb was selected in the first round as the tenth overall pick of the 1975 NFL draft. After being drafted, he held out for 43 days before signing with the San Francisco 49ers. He would go on to play over 100 games in the NFL.

During his second NFL season, Webb was admitted into the first class of the Mississippi State University College of Veterinary Medicine. Webb would attend the college during his offseasons, and graduated with his DVM degree in 1982.

== Personal life ==
After retiring from football following the 1981 NFL season, Webb has practiced veterinary medicine in California's Central Valley, specializing in embryo transfer. Webb has also developed his own herd of wagyu cattle, marketing live animals, semen, and embryos.

Webb has been married to his wife Cindy for over 40 years. Their twin sons, Josh and Micah, both attended UCLA and played on the Bruins football team.
