= Steve Towle =

American football player (born 1953)

No. 56
- Position: Linebacker

Personal information
- Born: October 23, 1953 (age 73); Kansas City, Kansas, U.S.
- Listed height: 6 ft 2 in (1.88 m)
- Listed weight: 233 lb (106 kg)

Career information
- High school: Shawnee Mission West (KS)
- College: Kansas
- NFL draft: 1975: 6th round, 143rd overall pick

Career history
- Miami Dolphins (1975–1980)

Awards and highlights
- PFWA All-Rookie Team (1975); First-team All-Big Eight (1974); Second-team All-Big Eight (1973)

Career NFL statistics
- Interceptions: 3
- Fumble recoveries: 7
- Sacks: 1.5
- Stats at Pro Football Reference

Stephen Richards Towle (born October 23, 1953) is an American former professional football player who was a linebacker in the National Football League (NFL). He was selected by the Miami Dolphins in the 6th round of the 1975 NFL draft. He played college football for the Kansas Jayhawks.

== Professional career ==
Towle was drafted by the Miami Dolphins in the sixth round of the 1975 NFL Draft. He holds the Dolphins record for a tackles in a season with 217 in 1976 and was the team's MVP during that season.
