= 1974 All-Big Eight Conference football team =

American all-star college football team

The 1974 All-Big Eight Conference football team consists of American football players chosen by various organizations for All-Big Eight Conference teams for the 1974 NCAA Division I football season. The selectors for the 1974 season included the Associated Press (AP).

== Offensive selections ==
=== Ends ===
- Tinker Owens, Oklahoma (AP-1)
- Mark Miller, Missouri (AP-1)
- Emmett Edwards, Kansas (AP-2)
- Wayne Hoffman, Oklahoma (AP-2)

=== Offensive tackles ===
- Jerry Arnold, Oklahoma (AP-1)
- Marvin Crenshaw, Nebraska (AP-1)
- Doug Payton, Colorado (AP-2)
- David Hernandez, Kansas State (AP-2)

=== Offensive guards ===
- John Roush, Oklahoma (AP-1)
- Tom Wolf, Oklahoma State (AP-1)
- Terry Webb, Oklahoma (AP-2)
- Tom Alward, Nebraska (AP-2)

=== Centers ===
- Rik Bonness, Nebraska (AP-1)
- Kyle Davis, Oklahoma (AP-2)

=== Quarterbacks ===
- David Humm, Nebraska (AP-1)
- Steve Davis, Oklahoma (AP-2)

=== Backs ===
- Joe Washington, Oklahoma (AP-1)
- Laverne Smith, Kansas (AP-1)
- Tony Galbreath, Missouri (AP-1)
- Mike Strachan, Iowa State (AP-2)
- George Palmer, Oklahoma State (AP-2)
- Terry Kunz, Colorado (AP-2)

== Defensive selections ==
=== Defensive ends ===
- Bob Martin, Nebraska (AP-1)
- Jimbo Elrod, Oklahoma (AP-1)
- Bob McRoberts, Missouri (AP-2)
- Dean Zook, Kansas (AP-2)

=== Defensive tackles ===
- Lee Roy Selmon, Oklahoma (AP-1)
- Phil Dokes, Oklahoma State (AP-1)
- Dave Johnston, Missouri (AP-2)
- Ron Pruitt, Nebraska (AP-2)

=== Middle guards ===
- Dewey Selmon, Oklahoma (AP-1)
- Mike Lemon, Kansas (AP-2)

=== Linebackers ===
- Rod Shoate, Oklahoma (AP-1)
- Tom Ruud, Nebraska (AP-1)
- Steve Towle, Kansas (AP-1)
- Scott Pickens, Missouri (AP-2)
- Brad Storm, Iowa State (AP-2)
- Bob Nelson, Nebraska (AP-2)

=== Defensive backs ===
- Barry Hill, Iowa State (AP-1)
- Randy Hughes, Oklahoma (AP-1)
- Kurt Knoff, Kansas (AP-1)
- Wonder Monds, Nebraska (AP-2)
- Tony Peters, Oklahoma (AP-2)
- Mike Terry, Oklahoma State (AP-2)

== Key ==
AP = Associated Press

== See also ==
- 1974 College Football All-America Team
