= Burton Lawless =

American football player (born 1953)

No. 66, 68
- Position: Guard

Personal information
- Born: November 1, 1953 (age 73); Dothan, Alabama, U.S.
- Listed height: 6 ft 4 in (1.93 m)
- Listed weight: 253 lb (115 kg)

Career information
- High school: Charlotte (Punta Gorda, Florida)
- College: Florida
- NFL draft: 1975: 2nd round, 44th overall pick

Career history
- Dallas Cowboys (1975–1979); Miami Dolphins (1980)*; Detroit Lions (1980); Miami Dolphins (1981); Chicago Bears (1982)*
- * Offseason or practice squad member only

Awards and highlights
- Super Bowl champion (XII); PFWA All-Rookie Team (1975); First-team All-American (1974); 2× Second-team All-SEC (1973, 1974); University of Florida Athletic Hall of Fame

Career NFL statistics
- Games played: 82
- Games started: 23
- Stats at Pro Football Reference

Richard Burton Lawless (born November 1, 1953) is an American former professional football player who was an offensive guard in the National Football League (NFL) for the Dallas Cowboys and Detroit Lions. He played college football for the Florida Gators, and earned All-American honors. He was selected in the second round of the 1975 NFL draft.

== Early life ==
Lawless was born in Dothan, Alabama, in 1953, before his family moved to Florida. He attended Charlotte High School in Punta Gorda, Florida, where he first drew recognition as an all-state tight end for the Charlotte Fighting Tarpons high school football team.

In 2007, thirty-six years after he graduated from high school, the Florida High School Athletic Association (FHSAA) recognized Lawless as one of the "100 Greatest Players of the First 100 Years" of Florida high school football. In 2001, he was inducted into the Charlotte High School Hall of Fame.

== College career ==
Lawless accepted an athletic scholarship to attend the University of Florida in Gainesville, Florida, where he played for coach Doug Dickey's Gators teams from 1971 to 1974. As a freshman, he broke his shoulder on his first practice and was moved to offensive tackle when he returned to the team, and eventually to offensive guard, where he arguably became the best pulling guard in Gators history.

He was a three-year starter, a second-team All-Southeastern conference (SEC) selection in 1973 and 1974, and a first-team All-American during his senior season in 1974. He also played in the 1975 Chicago College All-Star Game.

Lawless returned to the university during the NFL off-season to finish his bachelor's degree in exercise and sport sciences in 1977, and he was inducted into the University of Florida Athletic Hall of Fame as a "Gator Great" in 1978. In one of a series of articles published by The Gainesville Sun in 2006, he was recognized as one of the top 100 Gators (No. 42) of the first 100 years of Florida football.

== Professional career ==
Lawless was selected by the Dallas Cowboys in the second round (44th overall) of the 1975 NFL draft, also known as the Dirty Dozen draft. Mitch Hoopes and he were the only rookies to earn starting jobs, with Lawless replacing the traded John Niland at left guard and becoming the first-team rookie to start in the offensive line (including Super Bowl X) since 1965. At the end of the 1975 season, he was named to the NFL All-Rookie team.

In 1976, the improved play of Herbert Scott forced him into a platoon role. In 1977, he was moved to right guard but lost the starting job to Tom Rafferty. Injuries to Scott and John Fitzgerald allowed him to start 6 games (4 at left guard and 2 at right guard).

In 1978, he was back to serving as a messenger guard, alternating mainly with Rafferty. After requesting to be traded, he retired in 1980 during training camp and was subsequently traded to the Miami Dolphins for a draft choice (not exercised) on August 19. During his time with the Cowboys, he was a part of three Super Bowl teams, winning Super Bowl XII.

On August 19, 1980, he was traded to the Miami Dolphins in exchange for a draft choice (not exercised). He was released on September 1. On October 23, he signed as a free agent with the Detroit Lions, where he played in nine games and started 5 contests at left guard.

He was released on August 31, 1981. On November 17, he was signed by the Miami Dolphins to be the backup behind Bob Kuechenberg. He was released before the season finale on December 18, 1981.

On April 26, 1982, Lawless signed a contract with the Chicago Bears. In May, during the off-season, a 12-foot, 5,000-pound plow-arm fell on his head and neck, causing him to be paralyzed from the neck down for 17 days and ending his professional career.

During his seven-season NFL career, Lawless played in eighty-two games, and started in twenty-three of them.

== Personal life ==
Lawless attended the Cowboys alumni reunion and closing ceremony at Texas Stadium in Dallas on December 20, 2008. Blackie Lawless, the lead singer of one of the most popular glam bands of the 80’s. W.A.S.P. uses the last name Lawless. Blackie was watching a Cowboys game and like the last name and decided to use it.

== See also ==
- 1974 College Football All-America Team
- Florida Gators football, 1970–79
- List of Dallas Cowboys players
- List of Detroit Lions players
- List of Florida Gators football All-Americans
- List of Florida Gators in the NFL draft
- List of University of Florida alumni
- List of University of Florida Athletic Hall of Fame members
