= 1973 All-East football team =

American college football all-star team

The 1973 All-East football team consists of American football players chosen by various selectors as the best players at each position among the Eastern colleges and universities during the 1973 NCAA Division I football season.

== Offense ==
=== Quarterback ===
- Tom Parr, Colgate (AP-1)
- Jim Stoeckel, Harvard (AP-2)

=== Running backs ===
- John Cappelletti, Penn State (AP-1)
- Tony Dorsett, Pittsburgh (AP-1)
- J. J. Jennings, Rutgers (AP-1)
- Mike Esposito, Boston College (AP-2)
- Tom Sloan, Temple (AP-2)
- Mark van Eeghen, Colgate (AP-2)

=== Tight end ===
- Randy Grossman, Temple (AP-1)
- Mike Telep, Columbia (AP-2)

=== Wide receivers ===
- Danny Buggs, West Virginia (AP-1)
- Don Clune, Penn (AP-2)

=== Tackles ===
- Charlie Getty, Penn State (AP-1)
- Al Krevis, Boston College (AP-1)
- Len May, Navy (AP-2)
- Joe Miller, Villanova (AP-2)

=== Guards ===
- Dave Lapham, Syracuse (AP-1)
- Mark Markovich, Penn State (AP-1)
- Bob Arotsky, Colgate (AP-2)
- Andy Tighe, Rutgers (AP-2)

=== Center ===
- Joe Montgomery, William & Mary (AP-1)
- Bob Funk, Dartmouth (AP-2)

== Defense ==
=== Ends ===
- Jim Buckman, Pittsburgh (AP-1)
- Tom Csatari, Dartmouth (AP-1)
- Mitch Berger, Harvard (AP-2)
- Ed McAleney, Massachusetts (AP-2)

=== Tackles ===
- Randy Crowder, Penn State (AP-1)
- Mike Hartnest, Penn State (AP-1)
- Steve Allen, Rutgers (AP-2)
- Dave LaRoche, Boston University (AP-2)

=== Middle guard ===
- Mike Phillips, Cornell (AP-1)
- Dave Chinnock, Temple (AP-2)

=== Linebackers ===
- Bob Lally, Cornell (AP-1)
- Alex MacLellan, Boston College (AP-1)
- Ed O'Neil, Penn State (AP-1)
- Doug Allen, Penn State (AP-2)
- Rod Kirby, Pittsburgh (AP-2)
- Tom Zakowski, West Virginia (AP-2)

=== Defensive backs ===
- Carl Lewis, Yale (AP-1)
- Frank Polito, Villanova (AP-1)
- John Provost, Holy Cross (AP-1)
- Elvin Charity, Yale (AP-2)
- Dwight Fulton, Temple (AP-2)
- Ed Jones, Rutgers (AP-2)

== Key ==
- AP = Associated Press
- UPI = United Press International

== See also ==
- 1973 College Football All-America Team
