= Bob Martin (American football) =

American football player (born 1953)

No. 59, 54
- Position: Linebacker

Personal information
- Born: November 14, 1953 (age 72); David City, Nebraska, U.S.
- Listed height: 6 ft 1 in (1.85 m)
- Listed weight: 217 lb (98 kg)

Career information
- High school: David City
- College: Nebraska (1972–1975)
- NFL draft: 1976: 6th round, 163rd overall pick

Career history
- New York Jets (1976–1979); San Francisco 49ers (1979)

Awards and highlights
- 2× Second-team All-American (1974, 1975); 2× First-team All-Big Eight (1974, 1975)

Career NFL statistics
- Sacks: 2.5
- Interceptions: 5
- Fumble recoveries: 1
- Stats at Pro Football Reference

Robert A. Martin (born November 14, 1953) is an American former professional football player who was a linebacker for four seasons in the National Football League (NFL) with the New York Jets and San Francisco 49ers. He was selected by the Jets in the sixth round of the 1976 NFL draft after playing college football for the Nebraska Cornhuskers.

== Early life ==
Robert A. Martin was born on November 14, 1953, in David City, Nebraska. He attended David City High School, lettering in football, basketball, track, and golf. He earned 14 varsity letters in high school. He played both offense and defense on the football team, initially playing quarterback before converting to running back for his final two seasons. He was a linebacker on defense. Martin was named first-team Central Ten All-Conference for three straight seasons in both football and basketball. He also earned Class C first-team all-state honors in football in 1971 and 1972. Martin was also a runner-up for the state triple jump twice. He helped David City High win state titles in football and basketball his senior season as well. He was named the Nebraska High School Athlete of the Year by both the Lincoln Journal-Star and the Omaha World-Herald his senior year in 1972. He played in the Shrine Bowl all-star game after his senior year. Martin was inducted into the Nebraska High School Sports Hall of Fame in 2003.

== College career ==
Martin was a member of the Nebraska Cornhuskers of the University of Nebraska–Lincoln from 1972 to 1975. He started his college career as a running back on the freshman team before switching to defensive end later. He was a three-year letterman and a stand-up defensive end from 1973 to 1975. Martin started every game as a sophomore in 1973, recording 65 tackles and two fumble recoveries. He garnered Associated Press (AP) first-team All-Big Eight Conference honors his junior year in 1974 and AP and United Press International first-team All-Big Eight honors his senior year in 1975. He was named a second-team All-American by the AP in both 1974 and 1975, a second-team All-American by UPI in 1975, and a first-team All-American by Football News in 1975. He was also a team co-captain his senior season. Martin played in the Hula Bowl and Japan Bowl after his senior year.

== Professional career ==
Martin was selected by the New York Jets in the sixth round, with the 163rd overall pick, of the 1976 NFL draft. He played in 13 games, all starts at linebacker, for the Jets during the 1976 season, recording two interceptions. He started the first five games of the season in 1977 and made one interception before being placed on injured reserve with a separated shoulder on October 25, 1977. Martin started all 16 games for the Jets in 1978, totaling 2.5 sacks and two interceptions. The Jets finished the year with an 8–8 record. He started the first two games of the 1979 season before being released on September 19, 1979, after a contract dispute.

Martin was claimed off waivers by the San Francisco 49ers on September 20, 1979. He played in 13 games, starting two, for the 49ers in 1979, recording one fumble recovery. He was released on June 4, 1980.

== Personal life ==
After his NFL career, Martin spent time working for Valmont Industries, including stints as a product development manager and national sales manager. His daughter Anne and son Lee were on the Cornhuskers track team while another son Jay played football for the Cornhuskers.
