= Ben Williams (American football, born 1954) =

American football player (1954–2020)

No. 77
- Position: Defensive end

Personal information
- Born: September 1, 1954; Yazoo City, Mississippi, U.S.
- Died: May 18, 2020 (aged 65); Jackson, Mississippi, U.S.
- Listed height: 6 ft 3 in (1.91 m)
- Listed weight: 251 lb (114 kg)

Career information
- High school: Yazoo City
- College: Ole Miss (1972–1975)
- NFL draft: 1976: 3rd round, 78th overall pick

Career history
- Buffalo Bills (1976–1985)

Awards and highlights
- Pro Bowl (1982); 3× First-team All-SEC (1973, 1974, 1975); Ole Miss Rebels No. 74 retired

Career NFL statistics
- Sacks: 52
- Safeties: 1
- Fumble recoveries: 7
- Interceptions: 2
- Stats at Pro Football Reference

Robert Jerry Williams (September 1, 1954 – May 18, 2020), nicknamed "Gentle Ben", was an American professional football player who was a defensive end in the National Football League (NFL) from 1976 to 1985. Williams was the first Black person to play college football for the Ole Miss Rebels of the University of Mississippi.

Nicknamed "Gentle Ben" during his college days, Williams was a three-time All-SEC selection. He holds the school record for sacks in a single season (18) and in a career (37).

He was selected by the Buffalo Bills in the third round of the 1976 NFL draft. He was named to the Pro Bowl in 1982. During his ten years with the Bills, he made 45.5 sacks, a franchise record.

Williams is one of at least 345 NFL players to be diagnosed after death with chronic traumatic encephalopathy (CTE), which is caused by repeated hits to the head.

Two years after his death at 65, Ole Miss retired his number, 74, making Williams just the fourth person so honored. The ceremony took place on November 24, 2022, as Ole Miss played Mississippi State in the Egg Bowl.
