= Woodrow Lowe =

American football player and coach (1954–2025)

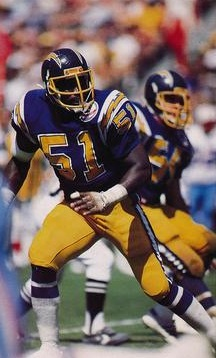
- Lowe in 1984

No. 51
- Position: Linebacker

Personal information
- Born: June 9, 1954; Columbus, Georgia, U.S.
- Died: November 6, 2025 (aged 71); Collierville, Tennessee, U.S.
- Listed height: 6 ft 0 in (1.83 m)
- Listed weight: 227 lb (103 kg)

Career information
- High school: Central (Phenix City, Alabama)
- College: Alabama (1972–1975)
- NFL draft: 1976: 5th round, 131st overall pick

Career history
- San Diego Chargers (1976–1986)

Awards and highlights
- San Diego Chargers 50th Anniversary Team; San Diego Chargers 40th Anniversary Team; National champion (1973); Consensus All-American (1974); 2× First-team All-American (1973, 1975); 3× First-team All-SEC (1973, 1974, 1975)

Career NFL statistics
- Games played: 164
- Games started: 151
- Interceptions: 21
- Stats at Pro Football Reference
- College Football Hall of Fame

Woodrow Lowe (June 9, 1954 – November 6, 2025) was an American professional football player who was a linebacker for the San Diego Chargers of the National Football League (NFL) from 1976 to 1986. Lowe played college football for the Alabama Crimson Tide under head coach Bear Bryant from 1972 to 1975. A three-time, first-team All-American, Lowe earned consensus honors in 1974 and was inducted into the College Football Hall of Fame. He was named to the Chargers' 40th and 50th anniversary teams. After retiring from playing, Lowe coached at the high school, college, and professional levels.

== Early life ==
Lowe was born in Columbus, Georgia, on June 9, 1954. He grew up in Phenix City, Alabama, where he started playing football at age 10. Lowe attended Central High School, where he was a standout player and captain of the football team. He also served as class president in his senior year.

== College playing career ==
Lowe enrolled at the University of Alabama in 1972, where he found instant success under head coach Bear Bryant. He became a starter in his first year, taking advantage of an National Collegiate Athletic Association (NCAA) rule change permitting freshman to play varsity football. He was named a first-team All-American in 1973, 1974, and 1975—including a consensus selection in 1974—and is one of two Crimson Tide players to earn first-team honors three times (the other being Cornelius Bennett). Lowe also played on four Southeastern Conference (SEC) championship teams, and one national championship team (1973) with Alabama. His Crimson Tide teams had a combined 43–5 record. He was named team captain in 1975.

Lowe also holds the Alabama record for most tackles in a season, with 134 stops as a sophomore in 1973. He had a then–school record 315 career tackles, which ranked fourth as of 2025.

== Professional playing career ==
After his time at Alabama, Lowe was chosen by the San Diego Chargers in the fifth round of the 1976 NFL draft with the 131st overall pick. Bryant told reporters, "That's like getting a fifty-dollar gold piece for fifty cents". Lowe was the first player from Alabama to be drafted by the Chargers. He missed just one game in his 11-year Chargers career, playing in 164 of a possible 165 games with 151 starts at right outside linebacker. He was particularly adept as a pass defender, racking up 21 interceptions as a Charger, with four being returned for a touchdown. He also recorded 26 sacks, 17 forced fumbles and eight fumble recoveries throughout his career.

Lowe was involved in the play known as the "Holy Roller". On September 10, 1978, he was tackling Oakland Raiders quarterback Ken Stabler with 10 seconds left in the game. As he was going down, Stabler intentionally fumbled the ball forward, which was eventually picked up and advanced for a touchdown by Dave Casper, leading to a 21–20 win. The play was called "the most zany, unbelievable, absolutely impossible dream of a play" by Raiders' broadcaster Bill King.

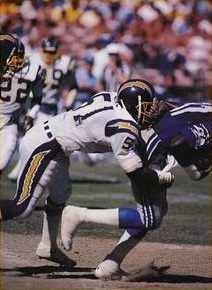
Lowe c. 1986

In 1979, Lowe had a career-high five interceptions, returning two for touchdowns. He became a team captain in 1980, a role he would serve for seven seasons. The Chargers advanced to the AFC Championship Game in both 1980 and 1981, but lost both times. He was among the top defenders of those teams, and was named a Pro Bowl alternate in 1981. Those Chargers squads were more renown for their "Air Coryell" offense.

Lowe missed the only game of his career in 1984 against Seattle. He had a hip pointer and wanted to play, but the Chargers would not allow him. His play began to decline in 1986, when he did not log an interception for just the second time in his career, and he failed to sack the quarterback for the first time.

Lowe spent 1987 on injured reserve, but would not have played ahead of Billy Ray Smith or Chip Banks even if he were healthy. The Chargers rescinded their qualifying offer to Lowe in 1988 at his request to become a free agent.

== Coaching career ==
After retiring from playing, Lowe became a football coach. He coached for two years at Russell County High School in Seale, Alabama, before returning to his high school as an assistant coach on Central's 1993 state championship team. Lowe served as head football coach at Selma High School in Selma from 1994 to 1995, compiling a 10–10 record. He then spent six years in the NFL as a defensive assistant. He was a member of Marty Schottenheimer's staff with the Kansas City Chiefs from 1995 to 1998 before joining the Oakland Raiders under Jon Gruden. Lowe left the Raiders for the University of Alabama at Birmingham, where his mother was undergoing chemotherapy after being diagnosed with cancer.

After spending five years with the UAB Blazers serving as special teams coordinator and tight ends coach, Lowe moved back to the high school ranks and became the head coach and athletic director for Central rival Smiths Station. He was removed from his position at Smiths Station by the Lee County Board of Education in 2008 after compiling a total record of 12 wins and 19 losses in three years as head coach. Lowe became an assistant coach at Jackson-Olin High School in Birmingham. On December 30, 2009, he was named the head coach and returned home to his alma mater Central High. He was 33–13 through four seasons when his coaching contract was not renewed in 2014. The team had already completed spring practice and less than 100 days remained before the season opener. While he remained on staff as a physical education teacher, Lowe protested his removal and requested to be reinstated.

== Legacy ==
For his impact through athletics as a player and a coach, Lowe was inducted into the Alabama Sports Hall of Fame in 2001. He was elected to the College Football Hall of Fame in the class of 2009. He was also inducted into the Sugar Bowl Hall of Fame and the Senior Bowl Hall of Fame. Lowe was named to the Chargers' 40th and 50th anniversary teams after his playing career.

== Personal life ==
Lowe retired around 2019. His brother Eddie also played as a linebacker with the University of Alabama. He later became the mayor of Phenix City. Lowe's son, Woodrow Jr., was also a high school football coach holding positions at various institutions.

After a lengthy illness, Lowe died at home in Collierville, Tennessee, on November 6, 2025, at the age of 71.
