= 1974 All-SEC football team =

American college football all-star team

The 1974 All-SEC football team consists of American football players selected to the All-Southeastern Conference (SEC) chosen by various selectors for the 1974 NCAA Division I football season. Alabama won the conference.

== Offensive selections ==
=== Receivers ===
- Lee McGriff, Florida (AP-1, UPI)
- Stanley Morgan, Tennessee (UPI)
- Gene Washington, Georgia (AP-2)

=== Tight ends ===
- Barry Burton, Vanderbilt (AP-1, UPI)
- Richard Appleby, Georgia (AP-2)

=== Tackles ===
- Craig Hertwig, Georgia (AP-1, UPI)
- Warren Bryant, Kentucky (AP-1, UPI)
- Chuck Fletcher, Auburn (AP-2)
- Paul Parker, Florida (AP-2)

=== Guards ===
- Gene Moshier, Vanderbilt (AP-1)
- John Rogers, Alabama (AP-1)
- Mickey Marvin, Tennessee (UPI)
- Randy Johnson, Georgia (UPI)
- Burton Lawless, Florida (AP-2)
- Sam Nichols, Miss. St. (AP-2)

=== Centers ===
- Lee Gross, Auburn (AP-1)
- Sylvester Croom, Alabama (UPI)
- Rick Nuzum, Kentucky (AP-2)

=== Quarterbacks ===
- Rockey Felker, Miss. St. (AP-1, UPI)
- Mike Fanuzzi, Kentucky (AP-2)

=== Running backs ===
- Sonny Collins, Kentucky (AP-1, UPI)
- Willie Shelby, Alabama (AP-2, UPI)
- Stanley Morgan, Tennessee (AP-2, UPI [as E])
- Glynn Harrison, Georgia (AP-1)
- Walter Packer, Miss. St. (AP-1)
- Jamie O'Rourke, Vanderbilt (AP-2)
- Horace King, Georgia (AP-2)

== Defensive selections ==
=== Ends ===
- Leroy Cook, Alabama (AP-1, UPI)
- Rusty Deen, Auburn (AP-1)
- Preston Kendrick, Florida (UPI)
- Mike DuBose, Alabama (AP-2)
- David McKnight, Georgia (AP-2)

=== Tackles ===
- Jimmy Webb, Miss. St. (AP-1, UPI)
- Ben Williams, Ole Miss (AP-2, UPI)
- Steve Cassidy, LSU (AP-1)
- Robert Pullam, Tennessee (AP-2)

=== Linebackers ===
- Ken Bernich, Auburn (AP-1, UPI)
- Woody Lowe, Alabama (AP-1, UPI)
- Ralph Ortega, Florida (AP-2, UPI)
- Glenn Cameron, Florida (AP-1)
- Sylvester Boler, Georgia (AP-2)
- Harvey Hull, Miss. St. (AP-2)
- Tom Galbierz, Vanderbilt (AP-2)

=== Backs ===
- Mike Washington, Alabama (AP-1, UPI)
- Ricky Davis, Alabama (AP-1, UPI)
- Mike Fuller, Auburn (AP-1, UPI)
- Jay Chesley, Vanderbilt (AP-1)
- Randy Talbot, Florida (UPI)
- Jim McKinney, Auburn (AP-2)
- Mike Williams, LSU (AP-2)
- Steve Curnutte, Vanderbilt (AP-2)
- Wayne Fields, Florida (AP-2)

== Special teams ==
=== Kicker ===
- Mark Adams, Vanderbilt (AP-1)
- Allan Leavitt, Georgia (AP-2)

=== Punter ===
- Neil Clabo, Tennessee (AP-1)
- John Tatterson, Kentucky (AP-2)

== Key ==
AP = Associated Press.

UPI = United Press International

Bold = Consensus first-team selection by both AP and UPI

== See also ==
- 1974 College Football All-America Team
