= Rick Nuzum =

American football player (born 1952)

No. 51, 56
- Position: Center

Personal information
- Born: June 30, 1952 (age 74); Parkersburg, West Virginia, U.S.
- Listed height: 6 ft 4 in (1.93 m)
- Listed weight: 238 lb (108 kg)

Career information
- High school: Marietta (OH)
- College: Kentucky
- NFL draft: 1975: undrafted

Career history
- Los Angeles Rams (1975–1977); Green Bay Packers (1978)

Awards and highlights
- First-team All-American (1974); Second-team All-SEC (1974)

Career NFL statistics
- Games played: 30
- Stats at Pro Football Reference

Frederick Merril Nuzum (born June 30, 1952) is an American former professional football player who was a center in the National Football League (NFL). After playing college football for the Kentucky Wildcats, he first played with the Los Angeles Rams during the 1977 NFL season. The following season, he played with the Green Bay Packers.

Nuzum graduated from Marietta High School, Marietta Ohio in 1971. He is currently the care pastor at Grace Powell Church in Powell, Ohio.
