= Scott Anderson (American football) =

American football player (born 1951)

No. 56
- Position: Center

Personal information
- Born: February 13, 1951 (age 75)
- Listed height: 6 ft 4 in (1.93 m)
- Listed weight: 242 lb (110 kg)

Career information
- High school: Hannibal (Hannibal, Missouri)
- College: Missouri
- NFL draft: 1974: 3rd round, 77th overall pick

Career history
- Minnesota Vikings (1974–1976)

Awards and highlights
- Second-team All-American (1973); First-team All-Big Eight (1973)

Career NFL statistics
- Games played: 7
- Games started: 0
- Stats at Pro Football Reference

Donald Scott Anderson (born February 13, 1951) is an American former professional football player who was a center for the Minnesota Vikings of the National Football League (NFL). He played college football for the Missouri Tigers football.
