= Ken Bernich =

American football player (born 1951)

No. 53
- Position: Linebacker

Personal information
- Born: September 6, 1951 (age 75); Biloxi, Mississippi, U.S.
- Listed height: 6 ft 2 in (1.88 m)
- Listed weight: 250 lb (113 kg)

Career information
- High school: Archbishop Shaw (Marrero, Louisiana)
- College: Auburn
- NFL draft: 1975: 4th round, 101st overall pick

Career history
- New York Jets (1975)

Awards and highlights
- Consensus All-American (1974); First-team All-SEC (1974); 2× Second-team All-SEC (1972, 1973)

Career NFL statistics
- Games played: 5
- Games started: 0
- Fumble recoveries: 1
- Stats at Pro Football Reference

Kenneth Overton Bernich (born September 6, 1951) is an American former professional football player who was a linebacker for the New York Jets of the National Football League (NFL). He graduated from Archbishop Shaw High School in Marrero, Louisiana. Bernich played college football for the Auburn Tigers, earning consensus All-American honors in 1974. He was selected by the San Diego Chargers in the fourth round (101st overall pick) of the 1975 NFL draft. He played for the Jets in 1975.

After playing professional football, he became a high school football coach and a member of the All-Sports Association in Fort Walton Beach, Florida.

== Sources ==
- Kenneth Overton Bernich at databasefootball.com
- nfl.com profile
