= 1973 All-Big Eight Conference football team =

1973 Conference football team

The 1973 All-Big Eight Conference football team consists of American football players chosen by various organizations for All-Big Eight Conference teams for the 1973 NCAA Division I football season. The selectors for the 1973 season included the Associated Press (AP) and United Press International (UPI).

== Offensive selections ==
=== Ends ===
- Emmett Edwards, Kansas (AP-1; UPI-1)
- Frosty Anderson, Nebraska (AP-1; UPI-2)
- J. V. Cain, Colorado (AP-2; UPI-1)
- Keith Krepfle, Iowa State (AP-2; UPI-2)

=== Offensive tackles ===
- Daryl White, Nebraska (AP-1; UPI-1)
- Jim Schnietz, Missouri (AP-1; UPI-2)
- Eddie Foster, Oklahoma (AP-2; UPI-1)
- Tom Wolf, Oklahoma State (AP-2; UPI-2)

=== Offensive guards ===
- Bill Brittain, Kansas State (AP-1; UPI-2)
- John Roush, Oklahoma (AP-2; UPI-1)
- Doug Payton, Colorado (AP-1)
- Greg Horton, Colorado (UPI-1)
- Dan Anderson, Nebraska (AP-2)
- Terry Webb, Oklahoma (UPI-2)

=== Centers ===
- Scott Anderson, Missouri (AP-1; UPI-1)
- William McDonald, Colorado (AP-2; UPI-2)

=== Quarterbacks ===
- David Jaynes, Kansas (AP-1; UPI-1)
- Steve Davis, Oklahoma (AP-2; UPI-2)

=== Backs ===
- Joe Washington, Oklahoma (AP-1; UPI-1)
- Isaac Jackson, Kansas State (AP-1; UPI-1)
- Mike Strachan, Iowa State (AP-1; UPI-1)
- Waymon Clark, Oklahoma (AP-2; UPI-2)
- George Palmer, Oklahoma State (AP-2)
- David Logan, Colorado (AP-2)
- Charlie Davis, Colorado (UPI-2)
- Brent Blackman, Oklahoma State (UPI-2)

=== Placekickers ===
- Greg Hill, Missouri (UPI-1)
- Tom Goedjen, Iowa State (UPI-2)

== Defensive selections ==
=== Defensive ends ===
- Steve Manstedt, Nebraska (AP-1; UPI-1)
- Dean Zook, Kansas (AP-1; UPI-2)
- Gary Baccus, Oklahoma (AP-2; UPI-1)
- Mike Struck, Oklahoma (AP-2)
- Glenn Robinson, Oklahoma State (UPI-2)

=== Defensive tackles ===
- John Dutton, Nebraska (AP-1; UPI-1)
- Barry Price, Oklahoma State (AP-1; UPI-1)
- Mitch Sutton, Kansas (AP-2; UPI-2)
- Dewey Selmon, Oklahoma (AP-2; UPI-2)

=== Middle guards ===
- Lucious Selmon, Oklahoma (AP-1; UPI-1)
- John Bell, Nebraska (AP-2)
- Mike Lemon, Kansas (UPI-2)

=== Linebackers ===
- Cleveland Vann, Oklahoma State (AP-1; UPI-1)
- Rod Shoate, Oklahoma (AP-1; UPI-1)
- Lawrence Hunt, Iowa State (AP-1; UPI-1)
- Steve Towle, Kansas (AP-2; UPI-2)
- Matt Blair, Iowa State (AP-2; UPI-2)
- Ted Jornov, Iowa State (AP-2)
- Scott Pickens, Missouri (UPI-2)
- David Smith, Oklahoma (UPI-2)

=== Defensive backs ===
- Randy Hughes, Oklahoma (AP-1; UPI-1)
- John Moseley, Missouri (AP-1; UPI-1)
- Alvin Brown, Oklahoma State (AP-2; UPI-1)
- Kurt Knoff, Kansas (AP-1)
- Randy Borg, Nebraska (AP-2; UPI-2)
- Kenith Pope, Oklahoma (AP-2)
- Clyde Powers, Oklahoma (UPI-2)

== Key ==
AP = Associated Press

UPI = United Press International

== See also ==
- 1973 College Football All-America Team
