= Leroy Cook =

American football player (born 1952)

No. 98
- Position: Defensive end

Personal information
- Born: November 9, 1952 (age 73); Abbeville, Alabama, U.S.
- Listed height: 6 ft 4 in (1.93 m)
- Listed weight: 220 lb (100 kg)

Career information
- High school: Abbeville
- College: Alabama
- NFL draft: 1976: 10th round, 290th overall pick

Career history
- Dallas Cowboys (1976)

Awards and highlights
- National champion (1973); Unanimous All-American (1975); Consensus All-American (1974); 2× First-team All-SEC (1974, 1975); Alabama Team of the Century; Team Captain (1975); Alabama Crimson Tide record for forced fumbles in a career (10); Alabama Crimson Tide record for sacks in a career (15); Alabama Crimson Tide record for tackles for a loss in a career (27)

Leroy Cook (born November 9, 1952) is an American former professional football player who was a linebacker for the Dallas Cowboys of the National Football League (NFL). He played college football for the Alabama Crimson Tide and was a two-time consensus All-American selection. Cook was selected by the Cowboys in the tenth round of the 1976 NFL draft.

== Early life ==
Cook attended Abbeville High School, where he played football and basketball. In football, he played wide receiver until his senior year, when he was switched to fullback, because the incumbent starter decided not to play that year. He was a three-time All-Wiregrass Athletic Conference and a two-time All-state player.

As a senior in 1971, he contributed to the school winning the state championship both in football and basketball.

== College career ==
Cook accepted a football scholarship from the University of Alabama. He worked his way into the defensive line rotation as a sophomore, despite injuring his foot in an offseason motorcycle accident.

He earned unanimous All-American honors in 1975 and was a consensus All-American in 1974. As a freshman, in 1972, Cook made 16 tackles (three for a loss) and caused two fumbles. In 1973, he made 18 tackles and again was credited with two caused fumbles. In 1974, his first as an All-America he made 81 tackles (10 for a loss) with six of those being sacks. He was credited with two more forced fumbles and blocked three kicks

In 1975, he made 85 tackles, (14 for losses) with 9 of those sacks and caused a career-high 4 fumbles. He was named SEC Player of the Year by the Atlanta Touchdown Club. He also served as team defensive captain that season. He was National Defensive Player of the Week following the University of Tennessee game in 1975, a 30–7 Tide win. He was Defensive MVP of the 1975 Orange Bowl.

Cook was selected to the Tide's Team of the Decade of the 1970s and he was also chosen to Sports Illustrated's All-Time University of Alabama team. Cook ended his career with 200 tackles with 27 for losses and 15 sacks. He forced 10 fumbles in 4-years which still ranks high in Alabama record books. He also blocked three kicks.

Cook was widely thought of as being a first to third round talent in the NFL draft, but on November 29, 1975, after a 28–0 win against the University of Auburn when Bob Baumhower slapped Cook's left shoulder pad from behind in a celebratory manner, Cook's right knee snapped and suffered a torn ligament. He sat out of most practices in the weeks leading to the Sugar Bowl against Penn State. He started the game but had to leave after his knee gave out in the first series and probably caused further damage to the original injury.

== Professional career ==
With his professional sports career in doubt, Cook ended up being selected by the Dallas Cowboys in the tenth round (290th overall pick) of the 1976 NFL draft.

Because he played in college as a stand-up defensive end, he was selected to play as an outside linebacker. He was placed on injured reserve to rehab his injury during 1976 season. Cook attempted to make the team in 1977, however, he was cut on July 22 and never signed another professional contract.

== Personal life ==
Cook eventually returned to Alabama, and worked at O'Neal Steel in Birmingham.
