= Isaac Jackson =

American football player (1952–1999)

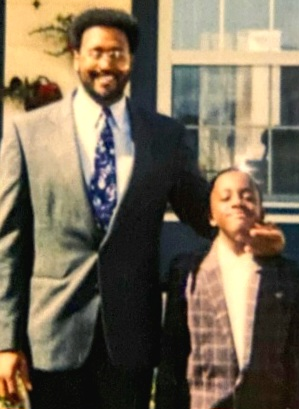
- Jackson and son Jamal in 1991

No. 25
- Position: Running back

Personal information
- Born: April 16, 1952; Macon, Georgia, U.S.
- Died: December 20, 1999; Denver, Colorado, U.S.
- Listed height: 5 ft 11 in (1.80 m)
- Listed weight: 185 lb (84 kg)

Career information
- High school: Central (Macon, GA)
- College: Kansas State University (1970–1973)
- NFL draft: 1974: 15th round, 106th overall pick

Awards and highlights
- First-team All-Big Eight (1973)

Isaac Jackson (April 16, 1952 – December 20, 1999) was an American football standout running back who played for Lanier High School and the Kansas State University Wildcats in the early 1970s. He was born and raised in Macon, Georgia, and gained recognition for his exceptional talent on the football field, earning numerous accolades and scholarships during his high school career. Jackson was later drafted by the Cincinnati Bengals in the 1974 NFL draft and wore the number 25 during his professional football career.

== Early years and personal life ==
Isaac was born to James Timothy Jackson, Sr. and Isabella Dumas Jackson in Macon, Georgia.

He attended Lanier High School where he began his football career. Jackson's coach, Godfrey Steiner, recognized his talent and created a highlight reel titled "See Isaac Run - The Highlight," showcasing Jackson's impressive plays and sent it to various division 1 universities. The highlight reel gained national attention, and in 1969, CBS. aired a nationally televised segment featuring the highlights and an interview with Isaac Jackson, further elevating his profile as a promising football player.

He later married his wife Brenda Taylor-Jackson and had two children together, daughter, Ciandra Jackson and son, Jamal Jackson, Sr.

== College career ==
Jackson accepted a scholarship to play for the Kansas State University Wildcats, a Division 1 football program in Manhattan, Kansas. He joined the Wildcats football team and continued to showcase his exceptional skills as a running back. Jackson had a successful college career, earning recognition for his speed, agility, and ability to find the end zone. He became a key player for the Wildcats, helping them achieve success on the football field.

== Legacy ==
Jackson died on December 20, 1999. Despite his short-lived career, he left a lasting legacy as a football player who was known for his talent, speed, and agility on the field. His high school and college careers were marked by numerous accolades, scholarships, and national recognition, showcasing his talent as a running back. Jackson's impact on the football community, particularly in Macon, Georgia, and at Kansas State University, continues to be remembered and celebrated by football fans and players alike.
