= Lee McGriff =

American football player (born 1953)

No. 83
- Position: Wide receiver

Personal information
- Born: October 3, 1953 (age 73); Tampa, Florida, U.S.
- Listed height: 5 ft 9 in (1.75 m)
- Listed weight: 163 lb (74 kg)

Career information
- High school: Plant (Tampa)
- College: Florida
- NFL draft: 1975: undrafted

Career history
- Dallas Cowboys (1975)*; Jacksonville Express (1975); Charlotte Hornets (1975); Tampa Bay Buccaneers (1976)
- * Offseason or practice squad member only

Awards and highlights
- First-team All-SEC (1974); Second-team All-SEC (1973); University of Florida Athletic Hall of Fame; Florida–Georgia Hall of Fame
- Stats at Pro Football Reference

Lee Colson McGriff (born October 3, 1953) is an American former professional football player who was a wide receiver for a single season with the Tampa Bay Buccaneers of the National Football League (NFL) in 1976. McGriff played college football for the Florida Gators. Thereafter, he played in the NFL for the Buccaneers in their inaugural season in 1976.

== Early life ==
He was born in Tampa, Florida, and attended Henry B. Plant High School in Tampa. He was a standout wide receiver for the Plant Panthers high school football team.

== College career ==
McGriff was raised in a family with a University of Florida sports tradition, but he was not offered an athletic scholarship to attend the university. Instead, he elected to walk on to coach Doug Dickey's Florida Gators football team, and played for the Gators from 1972 to 1974. He earned a place in the starting line-up and led the Gators in receiving in 1973 and 1974; McGriff averaged 18.5 yards on 38 catches with five touchdowns as a junior, and 19.4 yards on an SEC-leading 36 receptions with seven touchdowns as a senior team captain. He finished his three-year college career with 87 receptions for 1,551 yards and 13 touchdowns. Following his senior season, he was a first-team All-Southeastern Conference (SEC) selection and an honorable mention All-American, and was the recipient of the Gators' Fergie Ferguson Award. He graduated from the university with a bachelor's degree in journalism in 1976, and was later inducted into the University of Florida Athletic Hall of Fame.

== Professional career ==
McGriff signed as an undrafted free agent with the expansion Tampa Bay Buccaneers in 1976. He appeared in six games for the Buccaneers, and started three of them.

== Life after playing career ==
McGriff later served as an assistant coach for the Florida Gators, and became a partner in a successful Gainesville-based insurance agency. He has served as the color analyst for Gators football games on the Gator Sports Radio Network since 2004.

McGriff's son, Travis McGriff, played for the Florida Gators from 1995 to 1998.

== See also ==
- Florida Gators football, 1970–79
- History of the Tampa Bay Buccaneers
- List of Florida Gators in the NFL draft
- List of Tampa Bay Buccaneers players
- List of University of Florida alumni
- List of University of Florida Athletic Hall of Fame members
