= 1973 All-SEC football team =

American college football all-star team

The 1973 All-SEC football team consists of American football players selected to the All-Southeastern Conference (SEC) chosen by various selectors for the 1973 NCAA Division I football season. Alabama won the conference.

== Offensive selections ==
=== Receivers ===
- Wayne Wheeler, Alabama (AP-1, UPI)
- Lee McGriff, Florida (AP-2)

=== Tight ends ===
- Butch Veazey, Ole Miss (AP-2, UPI)
- Brad Boyd, LSU (AP-1)

=== Tackles ===
- Art Bressler, Ole Miss (AP-1, UPI)
- Mac McWhorter, Georgia (AP-1)
- Steve Sprayberry, Alabama (UPI)
- Harvey Sword, Kentucky (AP-2)
- Richard Brooks, LSU (AP-2)

=== Guards ===
- Buddy Brown, Alabama (AP-1, UPI)
- Tyler Lafauci, LSU (AP-1, UPI)
- Lee Gross, Auburn (AP-2)
- Burton Lawless, Florida (AP-2)

=== Centers ===
- Steve Taylor, Auburn (AP-1, UPI)
- Jimmy Ray Stephens, Florida (AP-2)

=== Quarterbacks ===
- Condredge Holloway, Tennessee (AP-1, UPI)
- Gary Rutledge, Alabama (AP-2)

=== Running backs ===
- Sonny Collins, Kentucky (AP-1, UPI)
- Wilbur Jackson, Alabama (AP-1, UPI)
- Brad Davis, LSU (AP-2, UPI)
- Wayne Jones, Miss. St. (AP-1)
- Haskel Stanback, Tennessee (AP-2)
- Steve Bisceglia, Alabama (AP-2)

== Defensive selections ==
=== Ends ===
- Jimmy Webb, Miss. St. (AP-2, UPI)
- Ricky Browne, Florida (AP-1)
- Binks Miciotto, LSU (AP-1)
- Jim McCollum, Kentucky (UPI)
- Mike DuBose, Alabama (AP-2)

=== Tackles ===
- Benny Sivley, Auburn (AP-1, UPI)
- Ben Williams, Ole Miss (AP-2, UPI)
- Mike Raines, Alabama (AP-1)
- David Hitchcock, Florida (AP-2)

=== Linebackers ===
- Warren Capone, LSU (AP-1, UPI)
- Woody Lowe, Alabama (AP-1, UPI)
- Ralph Ortega, Florida (AP-1, UPI)
- Jim Stuart, Ole Miss (AP-2)
- Ken Bernich, Auburn (AP-2)
- Bo Harris, LSU (AP-2)

=== Backs ===
- Eddie Brown, Tennessee (AP-1, UPI)
- Darryl Bishop, Kentucky (AP-2, UPI)
- Mike Washington, Alabama (AP-1)
- Jim Reveis, Florida (AP-1)
- David Langner, Auburn (UPI)
- David McMakin, Alabama (UPI)
- Harry Harrison, Ole Miss (AP-2)
- Mike Williams, LSU (AP-2)

== Special teams ==
=== Kicker ===
- Hawkins Golden, Vanderbilt (AP-1)
- Ricky Townsend, Tennessee (AP-2)

=== Punter ===
- Greg Gantt, Alabama (AP-1)
- Neil Clabo, Tennessee (AP-2)

=== Return specialist ===
- Mike Fuller, Auburn (AP-1)
- Willie Shelby, Alabama (AP-2)

== Key ==
AP = Associated Press

UPI = United Press International

Bold = Consensus first-team selection by both AP and UPI

== See also ==
- 1973 College Football All-America Team
