= Mike Washington (cornerback) =

American football player (1953–2021)

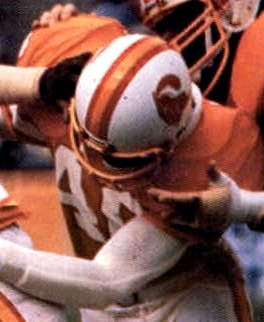
- Washington playing for the Buccaneers in 1979

No. 40
- Position: Cornerback

Personal information
- Born: January 7, 1953; Montgomery, Alabama, U.S.
- Died: December 27, 2021 (aged 68); Pike Road, Alabama, U.S.
- Listed height: 6 ft 2 in (1.88 m)
- Listed weight: 197 lb (89 kg)

Career information
- High school: Montgomery (AL) Lee
- College: Alabama
- NFL draft: 1975: 3rd round, 53rd overall pick

Career history
- Tampa Bay Buccaneers (1976–1984)

Awards and highlights
- National champion (1973); First-team All-American (1974); 2× First-team All-SEC (1973, 1974)

Career NFL statistics
- Interceptions: 28
- Fumble recoveries: 2
- Defensive touchdowns: 3
- Stats at Pro Football Reference

Michael Lee Washington (January 7, 1953 – December 27, 2021) was an American professional football player who was a cornerback for nine seasons with the Tampa Bay Buccaneers of the National Football League (NFL) from 1976 to 1984.

Born in Montgomery, Alabama, Washington was an All-American at Alabama in 1974 and was selected in the 3rd round (53rd overall) of 1975 NFL draft by the Baltimore Colts.

His career ended after a head injury in the 1984 season opener against the Chicago Bears at Soldier Field.
