= Mike Fuller =

American football player (born 1953)

No. 42
- Position: Safety

Personal information
- Born: April 7, 1953 (age 73); Jackson, Mississippi, U.S.
- Listed height: 5 ft 10 in (1.78 m)
- Listed weight: 188 lb (85 kg)

Career information
- High school: Shaw (Mobile, Alabama)
- College: Auburn
- NFL draft: 1975: 3rd round, 73rd overall pick

Career history
- San Diego Chargers (1975–1980); Cincinnati Bengals (1981–1982)

Awards and highlights
- Second-team All-American (1974); 2× First-team All-SEC (1973, 1974)

Career NFL statistics
- Interceptions: 17
- Fumble recoveries: 14
- Total TDs: 4
- Stats at Pro Football Reference

Michael Darwin Fuller (born April 7, 1953) is an American former professional football player who was a safety for eight seasons in the National Football League (NFL). He played college football for the Auburn Tigers.

Fuller grew up in Mobile, Alabama, where he played football for John Shaw High School. While at Auburn University, he was named to the All-SEC first-team for the 1973 and 1974 seasons.

As a safety in the NFL, Fuller intercepted 17 passes, which he returned for 176 yards and a touchdown, and recovered 14 fumbles (9 on offense, 5 on defense).

He was also a kick returner on special teams. In his 8 NFL seasons, he gained 1,701 yards returning kickoffs and 2,660 yards returning punts, with 2 touchdowns and a 10.6 yards per return average. Fuller recorded a 27-yard punt return in a 1981 AFC divisional playoff game against the Buffalo Bills and a 17-yard punt return in Super Bowl XVI.
