= Brad Davis (running back) =

American football player (born 1953)

No. 47
- Position: Running back

Personal information
- Born: February 9, 1953 (age 73); Hammond, Louisiana, U.S.
- Listed height: 5 ft 10 in (1.78 m)
- Listed weight: 204 lb (93 kg)

Career information
- High school: Hammond
- College: LSU
- NFL draft: 1975: 9th round, 211th overall pick

Career history
- Atlanta Falcons (1975–1976)

Awards and highlights
- First-team All-SEC (1973)
- Stats at Pro Football Reference

Bradford Timothy Davis (born February 9, 1953) is an American former professional football player who was a running back for two seasons with the Atlanta Falcons of the National Football League (NFL). He played college football for the LSU Tigers.

Davis was born in Hammond, Louisiana, and attended Hammond Magnet High School. He attended Louisiana State University, where he played football for the Tigers. He rushed for 2,253 yards on 472 carries in his college career, and had 16 rushing and two receiving touchdowns. He was named to the 1973 All-SEC team as a first-team selection by the United Press and second-team by the Associated Press after rushing for 904 yards and scoring seven total touchdowns during the season.
