= 1974 All-America college football team =

Official list of the best college football players of 1974

The 1974 All-America college football team is composed of college football players who were selected as All-Americans by various organizations and writers that chose College Football All-America Teams in 1974. The National Collegiate Athletic Association (NCAA) recognizes five selectors as "official" for the 1974 season. They are: (1) the American Football Coaches Association (AFCA); (2) the Associated Press (AP) selected based on the votes of sports writers at AP newspapers; (3) the Football Writers Association of America (FWAA) selected by the nation's football writers; (4) the United Press International (UPI) selected based on the votes of sports writers at UPI newspapers; and (5) the Walter Camp Football Foundation (WC). Other selectors included Football News (FN), the Newspaper Enterprise Association (NEA), The Sporting News (TSN), and Time magazine.

Six players were selected unanimously by all five of the official selectors. The six unanimous All-Americans included running backs Archie Griffin of Ohio State (the 1974 Heisman Trophy winner), Joe Washington of Oklahoma, and Anthony Davis of USC. On defense, the unanimous All-Americans were defensive back Dave Brown of Michigan, linebacker Rod Shoate of Oklahoma, and defensive end Randy White of Maryland.

The Ohio State and Oklahoma teams each had eight players who received first-team honors. The Ohio State honorees were Archie Griffin, tight end Doug France, tackle Kurt Schumacher, center Steve Myers, defensive end Van DeCree, defensive tackle Pete Cusick, defensive back Neal Colzie, and punter Tom Skladany. The Oklahoma honorees were Joe Washington, Rod Shoate, receiver Tinker Owens, guard John Roush, center Kyle Davis, defensive tackle Lee Roy Selmon, middle guard Dewey Selmon, and defensive back Randy Hughes.

== Consensus All-Americans ==
The following chart identifies the NCAA-recognized consensus All-Americans for the year 1974 and displays which first-team designations they received.

Name	Position	School	Number (Note: This column lists the number of selectors choosing the player as a first-team All-American as follows: official selectors/other selectors/total selectors.)	Official	Other
Dave Brown	Defensive back	Michigan	5/4/9	AFCA, AP, FWAA, UPI, WC	FN, NEA, Time, TSN
Rod Shoate	Linebacker	Oklahoma	5/4/9	AFCA, AP, FWAA, UPI, WC	FN, NEA, Time, TSN
Randy White	Defensive end	Maryland	5/4/9	AFCA, AP, FWAA, UPI, WC	FN, NEA, Time, TSN
Archie Griffin	Running back	Ohio State	5/3/8	AFCA, AP, FWAA, UPI, WC	FN, NEA, TSN
Joe Washington	Running back	Oklahoma	5/3/8	AFCA, AP, FWAA, UPI, WC	FN, NEA, TSN
Anthony Davis	Running back	USC	5/2/7	AFCA, AP, FWAA, UPI, WC	FN, TSN
Ken Huff	Offensive guard	North Carolina	4/3/7	AFCA, AP, UPI, WC	NEA, Time, TSN
Kurt Schumacher	Offensive tackle	Ohio State	4/3/7	AFCA, FWAA, UPI, WC	NEA, Time, TSN
Peter Demmerle	Wide receiver	Notre Dame	4/1/5	AFCA, AP, UPI, WC	NEA
Mike Hartenstine	Defensive tackle	Penn State	4/0/4	AFCA, AP, FWAA, UPI	--
Marvin Crenshaw	Offensive tackle	Nebraska	3/1/4	AFCA, FWAA, UPI	FN
Ken Bernich	Linebacker	Auburn	3/0/3	AFCA, AP, WC	--
Bennie Cunningham	Tight end	Clemson	3/0/3	AFCA, AP, UPI	--
Pat Donovan	Defensive end	Stanford	3/0/3	AFCA, FWAA, UPI	--
Steve Bartkowski	Quarterback	California	2/2/4	AP, UPI	NEA, Time
Richard Wood	Linebacker	USC	2/2/4	AP, UPI	FN, NEA
Gerry DiNardo	Offensive guard	Notre Dame	2/1/3	AFCA, UPI	FN
Louie Kelcher	Defensive tackle	SMU	2/1/3	AP, FWAA	FN
Woodrow Lowe	Linebacker	Alabama	2/1/3	UPI, WC	FN
Steve Myers	Center	Ohio State	2/1/3	AP, UPI	FN
John Roush	Offensive guard	Oklahoma	2/1/3	FWAA, UPI	FN
Pat Thomas	Defensive back	Texas A&M	2/1/3	AP, FWAA	NEA
Rubin Carter	Middle guard	Miami (FL)	2/0/2	AFCA, UPI	--
Leroy Cook	Defensive end	Mississippi State	2/0/2	AP, FWAA	--
John Provost	Defensive back	Holy Cross	2/0/2	AP, WC	--
Jimmy Webb	Defensive end	Mississippi State	2/0/2	AFCA, WC	--

== Offense ==
=== Receivers ===
- Peter Demmerle, Notre Dame (AFCA [split end], AP-1, UPI-1, WC, NEA-1)
- Pat McInally, Harvard (AFCA [flanker], AP-2, FWAA, UPI-2, WC, FN, NEA-2)
- Larry Burton, Purdue (FWAA, NEA-2, TSN, Time)
- Tinker Owens, Oklahoma (NEA-1)
- Emmett Edwards, Kansas (TSN)
- Danny Buggs, West Virginia (Time)
- Barry Burton, Vanderbilt (AP-2 [te], FN)
- Steve Rivera, California (AP-3)

=== Tight ends ===
- Bennie Cunningham, Clemson (AFCA, AP-1, UPI-1)
- Jim O'Bradovich, USC (NEA-1)
- Charles Waddell, North Carolina (TSN)
- Elmore Stephens, Kentucky (Time-t)
- Oscar Roan, Southern Methodist (Time-t)
- Dan Natale, Penn State (UPI-2)
- Doug France, Ohio State (NEA-2, Time [t])
- Dick Pawlewicz, William & Mary (AP-3)

=== Tackles ===
- Kurt Schumacher, Ohio State (AFCA, FWAA, UPI-1, WC, NEA-1, TSN, Time)
- Marvin Crenshaw, Nebraska (AFCA, AP-2, FWAA, UPI-1, FN, NEA-2)
- Dennis Harrah, University of Miami (Fla.) (AP-2, TSN, UPI-2, NEA-1, Time)
- Craig Hertwig, Georgia (AP-1, NEA-2)
- Al Krevis, Boston College (AP-1)
- Bob Simmons, Texas (UPI-2, WC)
- Dennis Lick, Wisconsin (FN)
- Mike Biehle, Miami (OH) (AP-3)
- Steve Sylvester, Notre Dame (AP-3)

=== Guards ===
- Ken Huff, North Carolina (AFCA, AP-1, UPI-2, WC, NEA-1, Time, TSN)
- Gerry DiNardo, Notre Dame (AFCA, UPI-1, FN)
- John Roush, Oklahoma (AP-2, FWAA, UPI-1, FN)
- Bill Bain, USC (TSN, Time)
- Burton Lawless, Florida (NEA-1)
- John Nessel, Penn State (WC)
- Andy Dearman, VMI (AP-2)
- Revie Sorey, Illinois (NEA-2)
- Carl Dean, New Mexico State (AP-3)
- Steve Ostermann, Washington State (AP-3, UP-2)

=== Centers ===
- Steve Myers, Ohio State (AP-1 [g], UPI-1, FN, NEA-2 [g])
- Rik Bonness, Nebraska (AP-1)
- Geoff Reece, Washington State (WC, NEA-2, Time)
- Sylvester Croom, Alabama (AFCA, UPI-2)
- Aubrey Schulz, Baylor (AP-2, FWAA)
- Rick Nuzum, Kentucky (NEA-1)
- Kyle Davis, Oklahoma (TSN)
- Jack Balorunos, Penn State (AP-3)

=== Quarterbacks ===
- Steve Bartkowski, California (AP-1, UPI-1, NEA-1, Time-t)
- David Humm, Nebraska (AFCA, AP-2, TSN, Time-t, FN)
- Tom Clements Notre Dame (FWWA)
- Steve Joachim, Temple (AP-3, UPI-2, WC)
- Freddie Solomon, Tampa (NEA-2)

=== Running backs ===
- Archie Griffin, Ohio State (AFCA, AP-1, FWAA, UPI-1, WC, FN, NEA-1, TSN)
- Joe Washington, Oklahoma (AFCA, AP-1, FWAA, UPI-1, WC, FN, NEA-1, TSN)
- Anthony Davis, USC (AFCA, AP-1, FWAA, UPI-1, WC, FN, NEA-2, Time)
- Walter Payton, Jackson State (Time)
- Don Hardeman, Texas A&M (Time)
- Stan Fritts, NC State (AP-2)
- Willard Harrell, Pacific (AP-2)
- Billy Marek, Wisconsin (AP-2, UPI-2)
- Tony Dorsett, Pittsburgh (AP-3, UPI-2, NEA-2)
- Louie Giammona, Utah State (AP-3, UPI-2)
- Walt Snickenberger, Princeton (AP-3)

== Defense ==
=== Defensive ends ===
- Randy White, Maryland (AFCA [DT], AP-1, FWAA, UPI-1 [DT], WC, FN [DT], NEA-1, TSN, Time)
- Pat Donovan, Stanford (AFCA, FWAA, UPI-1)
- Jimmy Webb, Mississippi State (AFCA, AP-3 [DT], WC, NEA-2 [DT])
- Leroy Cook, Alabama (AP-1, FWAA, UP-2)
- Mack Mitchell, Houston (AP-2, WC, NEA-1, TSN, Time)
- Van DeCree, Ohio State (UPI-1, FN)
- Steve Niehaus, Notre Dame (FN)
- Bob Martin, Nebraska (AP-2)
- Ecomet Burley, Texas Tech (NEA-2)
- Fred Dean, Louisiana Tech (NEA-2)
- Jimbo Elrod, Oklahoma (AP-3)
- Greg Murphy, Penn State (AP-3, UP-2)

=== Defensive tackles ===
- Mike Hartenstine, Penn State (AFCA, AP-1, FWAA, UPI-1)
- Louie Kelcher SMU (AP-1 [mg], FWAA, FN, NEA-2 [mg])
- Mike Fanning, Notre Dame (AP-2, WC, NEA-1, TSN, Time)
- Doug English, Texas (AP-1, Time)
- Lee Roy Selmon, Oklahoma (AP-2, UP-2, NEA-1)
- Pete Cusick, Ohio State (AP-3, TSN, UP-2)
- Wayne Baker, BYU (NEA-2)

=== Middle guards ===
- Rubin Carter, Miami (Fla.) (AFCA, AP-3, UPI-1)
- Gary Johnson, Grambling (NEA-1, Time [DT])
- Gary Burley, Pittsburgh (UP-2, WC)
- Dewey Selmon, Oklahoma (FN)

=== Linebackers ===
- Rod Shoate, Oklahoma (AFCA, AP-1, FWAA, UPI-1, WC, FN, NEA-1, TSN, Time)
- Richard Wood, USC (AP-1, UPI-1, FN, NEA-1)
- Ken Bernich, Auburn (AFCA, AP-1, WC)
- Woodrow Lowe, Alabama (UPI-1, WC, FN)
- Bob Breunig, Arizona State (AFCA, AP-2, UP-2, TSN, Time)
- Ralph Ortega, Florida (TSN, Time)
- Greg Collins, Notre Dame (AP-2, FWAA)
- Brad Cousino, Miami (Ohio) (AP-2 [MG], FWAA)
- Robert Brazile, Jackson State (Time)
- Ed Simonini, Texas A&M (AP-2, UP-2)
- Steve Strinko, Michigan (UP-2)
- Derrel Luce, Baylor (NEA-2)
- Glenn Cameron, Florida (AP-3)
- Al Humphrey, Tulsa (AP-3)
- Danny Kepley, East Carolina (AP-3, NEA-2)

=== Defensive backs ===
- Dave Brown, Michigan (AFCA, AP-1, FWAA, UPI-1, WC, FN, NEA-1 [s], TSN, Time [s])
- Pat Thomas, Texas A&M (AP-1, FWAA, NEA-1 [cb])
- John Provost, Holy Cross (AP-1, UP-2, WC)
- Neal Colzie, Ohio State (AP-2, UPI-1, NEA-1 [cb], TSN, Time [cb])
- Mike Williams, LSU (AFCA, TSN, Time [cb])
- Mike Washington, Alabama (NEA-1 [s], FN, UP-2, Time [cb])
- Robert Giblin, Houston (AFCA, TSN, Time [s])
- Charles Phillips, Southern California (FWAA)
- Randy Hughes, Oklahoma (AP-2, UPI-1, NEA-2 [s])
- Randy Rhino, Georgia Tech (AP-2, WC)
- Mike Fuller, Auburn (FN, NEA-2 [s])
- Tim Gray, Texas A&M (NEA-2)
- Marvin Cobb, USC (AP-3)
- Barry Hill, Iowa State (AP-3, UPI-2)
- Louie Wright, San Jose State (AP-3, NEA-2)

== Special teams ==
=== Kickers ===
- Steve Mike-Mayer, Maryland (TSN, Time)
- Dave Lawson, Air Force (FWAA)

=== Punters ===
- Tom Skladany, Ohio State (FWAA)
- Skip Boyd, Washington (TSN)
- Jeff West, Cincinnati (Time)

== Key ==
- **Bold** – Consensus All-American
- -1 – First-team selection
- -2 – Second-team selection
- -3 – Third-team selection

=== Official selectors ===
- AFCA – American Football Coaches Association
- AP – Associated Press
- FWAA – Football Writers Association of America
- UPI – United Press International
- WC – Walter Camp Football Foundation

=== Other selectors ===
- FN – Football News
- NEA – Newspaper Enterprise Association
- TSN – The Sporting News
- Time – Time magazine

== See also ==
- 1974 All-Atlantic Coast Conference football team
- 1974 All-Big Eight Conference football team
- 1974 All-Big Ten Conference football team
- 1974 All-Pacific-8 Conference football team
- 1974 All-SEC football team
- 1974 All-Southwest Conference football team
