= Glenn Cameron =

American football player (born 1953)

No. 50
- Position: Linebacker

Personal information
- Born: February 21, 1953 (age 73); Miami, Florida, U.S.
- Listed height: 6 ft 2 in (1.88 m)
- Listed weight: 225 lb (102 kg)

Career information
- High school: Coral Gables Senior (Coral Gables, Florida)
- College: Florida (1971–1974)
- NFL draft: 1975: 1st round, 14th overall pick

Career history
- Cincinnati Bengals (1975–1985)

Awards and highlights
- Third-team All-American (1974); First-team All-SEC (1974); University of Florida Athletic Hall of Fame

Career NFL statistics
- Games played: 159
- Games started: 84
- Interceptions: 5
- Stats at Pro Football Reference

Glenn Scott Cameron (born February 21, 1953) is an American former professional football player who was a linebacker in the National Football League (NFL) for eleven seasons during the 1970s and 1980s. Cameron played college football for the University of Florida, and thereafter, he played professionally for the Cincinnati Bengals of the NFL.

== Early life ==
Cameron was born in Miami, Florida in 1953. He attended Coral Gables Senior High School in Coral Gables, Florida, and he was a star high school football player for the Coral Gables Cavaliers.

== College career ==
Cameron accepted an athletic scholarship to attend the University of Florida in Gainesville, Florida, where he played linebacker for coach Doug Dickey's Florida Gators football team from 1971 to 1974. Cameron was a first-team All-Southeastern Conference (SEC) selection and an Associated Press third-team All-American in 1974.

Cameron graduated from the University of Florida with a bachelor's degree in management in 1976, and returned to earn a J.D. degree in 1987. He was inducted into the University of Florida Athletic Hall of Fame as a "Gator Great" in 1984. The sportswriters of The Gainesville Sun ranked him as one of the 100 greatest Gators (No. 43) of the first century of Florida football in 2006.

== Professional career ==
Cameron was chosen by the Cincinnati Bengals in the first round (14th pick overall) of the 1975 NFL draft, and he spent his entire eleven-year NFL career with the Bengals, playing from 1975 to 1985. He was a member of the American Football Conference (AFC) champion Bengals team that played in Super Bowl XVI in 1982. During his eleven-season career with the Bengals, he played in 159 games, started in eighty-four of them, intercepted five passes, and recovered three fumbles.

== Personal life ==
Cameron is now a practicing, board certified trial lawyer and partner in the law firm of Cameron & Marroney PLLC, in West Palm Beach, Florida.

== See also ==
- Florida Gators football, 1970–79
- History of the Cincinnati Bengals
- List of Florida Gators football All-Americans
- List of Florida Gators in the NFL draft
- List of Levin College of Law graduates
- List of University of Florida alumni
- List of University of Florida Athletic Hall of Fame members
