= Tinker Owens =

American football player (born 1954)

No. 83
- Position: Wide receiver

Personal information
- Born: October 3, 1954 (age 72); Miami, Oklahoma, U.S.
- Listed height: 5 ft 11 in (1.80 m)
- Listed weight: 170 lb (77 kg)

Career information
- High school: Miami (OK)
- College: Oklahoma
- NFL draft: 1976: 4th round, 95th overall pick

Career history
- New Orleans Saints (1976, 1978–1980)

Awards and highlights
- 2× National champion (1974, 1975); First-team All-American (1974); First-team All-Big Eight (1974)

Career NFL statistics
- Receptions: 60
- Receiving yards: 785
- Receiving TDs: 4
- Stats at Pro Football Reference

Charles Wayne "Tinker" Owens is an American former professional football player who was a wide receiver for four seasons with the New Orleans Saints (1976, 1978–1980) of the National Football League (NFL). in the National Football League (NFL). The younger brother of Heisman Trophy winner Steve Owens, Tinker was a two-time All-American (1974, 1975) playing college football for the Oklahoma Sooners.
