= Dewey Selmon =

American football player (born 1953)

Dr. Dewey Selmon
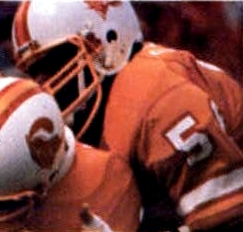
- Selmon playing for the Buccaneers in 1979

No. 61, 58
- Positions: Linebacker, defensive tackle

Personal information
- Born: November 19, 1953 (age 72); Eufaula, Oklahoma, U.S.
- Listed height: 6 ft 1 in (1.85 m)
- Listed weight: 246 lb (112 kg)

Career information
- High school: Eufaula
- College: Oklahoma
- NFL draft: 1976: 2nd round, 60th overall pick

Career history
- Tampa Bay Buccaneers (1976–1981); San Diego Chargers (1982)

Awards and highlights
- Second-team All-Pro (1979); 2× National champion (1974, 1975); Consensus All-American (1975); All-American (1974); 2× First-team All-Big Eight (1974, 1975); Second-team All-Big Eight (1973)

Career NFL statistics
- Sacks: 2
- Fumble recoveries: 3
- Interceptions: 3
- Stats at Pro Football Reference
- College Football Hall of Fame

Dewey Willis Selmon (born November 19, 1953) is an American former professional football player who was a linebacker in the National Football League (NFL). He played college football for the Oklahoma Sooners, forming the defensive line with brothers Lucious and Lee Roy, among others.

He went on to play in the NFL for the Tampa Bay Buccaneers and the San Diego Chargers.

He earned a Ph.D. in Philosophy from the University of Oklahoma. He is a member of the College Academic Hall of Fame.
