= Joe Washington =

American football player (born 1953)

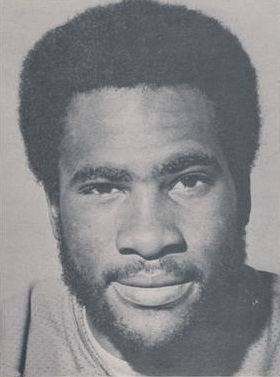
- Washington in 1976

No. 24, 20, 25, 27
- Position: Running back

Personal information
- Born: September 24, 1953 (age 73); Crockett, Texas, U.S.
- Listed height: 5 ft 9 in (1.75 m)
- Listed weight: 179 lb (81 kg)

Career information
- High school: Abraham Lincoln (Port Arthur, Texas)
- College: Oklahoma
- NFL draft: 1976: 1st round, 4th overall pick

Career history
- San Diego Chargers (1976–1977); Baltimore Colts (1978–1980); Washington Redskins (1981–1984); Atlanta Falcons (1985)

Awards and highlights
- Super Bowl champion (XVII); Pro Bowl (1979); NFL receptions leader (1979); 70 Greatest Redskins; 2× National champion (1974, 1975); Unanimous All-American (1974); First-team All-American (1975); Third-team All-American (1973); 3× First-team All-Big Eight (1973, 1974, 1975)

Career NFL statistics
- Rushing attempts: 1,195
- Rushing yards: 4,839
- Rushing touchdowns: 12
- Stats at Pro Football Reference
- College Football Hall of Fame

Joe Dan Washington Jr (born September 24, 1953) is an American former professional football player who was a running back in the National Football League (NFL) for the San Diego Chargers, Baltimore Colts, Washington Redskins, and Atlanta Falcons.

== Early life ==
Washington graduated from Lincoln High School in Port Arthur, Texas, where his father coached football. Washington had a stellar college football career at the University of Oklahoma, where he was a two-time First-team All-American and finished third in the Heisman Trophy balloting in 1974 and fifth in 1975. He finished his career at Oklahoma with 4,071 career rushing yards. He is a member of the College Football Hall of Fame.

== Professional career ==
=== San Diego Chargers ===
Washington was drafted fourth overall in the first round of the 1976 NFL Draft by the San Diego Chargers. A knee injury forced him to miss the entire 1976 season for the Chargers. In 1977 he played sparingly, appearing in 13 games while rushing for 217 yards and having 244 yards receiving.

=== Baltimore Colts ===
He was traded along with a 1979 fifth-round selection (131st overall–traded to Detroit Lions for Greg Landry) from the Chargers to the Colts for Lydell Mitchell on August 23, 1978. The transaction was the result of Mitchell's acrimonious contract dispute with Colts management in which he accused team owner Robert Irsay of bad faith bargaining and racial discrimination.

In 1978, his first year with the Colts, he had 958 yards rushing, which was a career high.

In 1979 he led the NFL with 82 receptions. He also had 750 yards receiving and 884 yards rushing along with seven touchdowns. This led Washington to being voted to the 1979 Pro Bowl.

His most memorable performance was on September 18, 1978, in Baltimore's 34–27 victory over the New England Patriots on Monday Night Football, when he had a hand in three of the four touchdowns scored by the Colts in a fourth quarter in which both teams combined for 41 points. He helped lead off the scoring by throwing a 54-yard option pass to Roger Carr. Washington followed that up with a 23-yard touchdown catch from Bill Troup. Washington broke a 27–27 deadlock by scoring the game-winner on a 90-yard kickoff return in a driving rainstorm. It was scored in the final seconds of the game after the Patriots came back from 27 to 13.[1][2]

He remains the only NFL player to ever throw a touchdown, catch a touchdown and return a kickoff for a touchdown in a single game.

=== Washington Redskins ===
On April 28, 1981, the Washington Redskins obtained Washington by trading a second-round pick in the 1981 NFL Draft to the Baltimore Colts.

During his first year with the Redskins in 1981, Washington combined with future Hall of Famer John Riggins to give the Redskins a formidable running game. Washington led the team in rushing with 916 yards and receptions with 70 to go along with 558 yards receiving. The strike shortened 1982 season was mostly a disappointing season for Washington as he only recorded 190 yards rushing during the 9 game regular season and only touched the ball seven times during the Redskins run through the playoffs where they defeated the Miami Dolphins in Super Bowl XVII.

Washington returned to his normal dual threat capabilities in 1983 as he recorded 772 yards rushing and 454 yards receiving as the Redskins returned to the Super Bowl only to lose Super Bowl XVIII to the Los Angeles Raiders.

During the 1984 season, Washington only played in 7 games for the Redskins and recorded 192 yards rushing.

=== Atlanta Falcons ===
He was traded to the Atlanta Falcons during the 1985 NFL draft and finished his career with one season in Atlanta. During the 1985 season with the Falcons, Washington appeared in all 16 games while recording 210 yards rushing and 37 receptions for 328 yards.

Washington retired with 4,839 rushing yards and 3,413 receiving yards and 30 touchdowns in his career.

== NFL career statistics ==
Legend
	Won the Super Bowl
	Led the league
**Bold**	Career high

=== Regular season ===
Year	Team	Games		Rushing					Receiving				
Year	Team	GP	GS	Att	Yds	Avg	Lng	TD	Rec	Yds	Avg	Lng	TD
1977	SDG	13	0	62	217	3.5	19	0	31	244	7.9	29	0
1978	BAL	**16**	12	240	**956**	4.0	29	0	45	377	8.4	33	1
1979	BAL	15	**15**	**242**	884	3.7	26	**4**	**82**	**750**	9.1	43	3
1980	BAL	**16**	11	144	502	3.5	17	1	51	494	**9.7**	33	3
1981	WAS	14	13	210	916	4.4	32	**4**	70	558	8.0	32	3
1982	WAS	7	1	44	190	4.3	40	1	19	134	7.1	17	1
1983	WAS	15	1	145	772	**5.3**	**41**	0	47	454	**9.7**	**67**	**6**
1984	WAS	7	0	56	192	3.4	12	1	13	74	5.7	12	0
1985	ATL	**16**	0	52	210	4.0	14	1	37	328	8.9	34	1
		119	53	1,195	4,839	4.0	41	12	395	3,413	8.6	67	18

=== Playoffs ===
Year	Team	Games		Rushing					Receiving				
Year	Team	GP	GS	Att	Yds	Avg	Lng	TD	Rec	Yds	Avg	Lng	TD
1982	WAS	**4**	0	4	22	**5.5**	**11**	0	3	33	**11.0**	**15**	0
1983	WAS	3	0	**14**	**29**	2.1	8	0	**7**	**51**	7.3	10	0
1984	WAS	1	0	1	5	5.0	5	0	2	12	6.0	8	0
		8	0	19	56	2.9	11	0	12	96	8.0	15	0

== Post-football career ==
He had worked as a financial adviser for Wells Fargo. With former basketball player Julius Erving, Washington fielded a NASCAR Busch Series team from 1998 to 2000. In May 2007, Washington returned to the University of Oklahoma, to serve as the special assistant to the director of athletics/executive director of the Varsity O Association.
