= Rod Shoate =

American football player (1953–1999)

No. 56
- Position: Linebacker

Personal information
- Born: April 25, 1953; Spiro, Oklahoma, U.S.
- Died: October 4, 1999 (aged 46); Spiro, Oklahoma, U.S.
- Listed height: 6 ft 1 in (1.85 m)
- Listed weight: 214 lb (97 kg)

Career information
- High school: Spiro (OK)
- College: Oklahoma
- NFL draft: 1975: 2nd round, 41st overall pick

Career history
- New England Patriots (1975–1981); New Jersey Generals (1983); Memphis Showboats (1984)

Awards and highlights
- National champion (1974); Unanimous All-American (1974); Consensus All-American (1973); Big Eight Defensive Player of the Year (1974); 3× First-team All-Big Eight (1972, 1973, 1974)

Career NFL statistics
- Sacks: 22.5
- Fumble recoveries: 7
- Interceptions: 5
- Stats at Pro Football Reference
- College Football Hall of Fame

Roderick Shoate (April 26, 1953 – October 4, 1999) was an American professional football linebacker in the National Football League (NFL). He was a four-time All-Big 8 Conference Player and a three-time All-American at the University of Oklahoma. He played seven seasons in the NFL for the New England Patriots, and then in the United States Football League (USFL) for the New Jersey Generals and Memphis Showboats.

Shoate, who died in 1999 after a long illness, was elected posthumously to the College Football Hall of Fame. in 2013.

Former coaches and teammates attribute Shoate's speed, attention to detail, and relentless pursuit of the other team to his success as a player.
