= Jimbo Elrod =

American football player (1954–2016)

No. 57, 54
- Position: Linebacker

Personal information
- Born: May 25, 1954; Memphis, Tennessee, U.S.
- Died: December 12, 2016 (aged 62); Chandler, Oklahoma, U.S.
- Listed height: 6 ft 0 in (1.83 m)
- Listed weight: 220 lb (100 kg)

Career information
- High school: Tulsa (OK) East Central
- College: Oklahoma
- NFL draft: 1976: 5th round, 144th overall pick

Career history
- Kansas City Chiefs (1976–1978); Houston Oilers (1979)

Awards and highlights
- 2× National champion (1974, 1975); Consensus All-American (1975); Third-team All-American (1974); 2× First-team All-Big Eight (1974, 1975)

Career NFL statistics
- Games played-started: 40-3
- Interceptions: 1
- Fumble recoveries: 1
- Stats at Pro Football Reference

James Whittington "Jimbo" Elrod (May 25, 1954 – December 12, 2016) was an American professional football linebacker who was an All-American at the University of Oklahoma and played professionally for the Kansas City Chiefs and the Houston Oilers of the National Football League (NFL).

Elrod graduated from East Central High School in Tulsa, Oklahoma, in 1972 and was a member of the National Championship football teams of 1974 and 1975. Elrod earned consensus All-America honors in 1975, when he had 20 tackles for loss. His 44 tackles for loss led the career list at the University of Oklahoma until 2001 (it now stands as sixth-best all-time).

Elrod starred in the 1976 Orange Bowl a 14–6 victory over the University of Michigan that secured the Sooners a fifth national championship. The Oklahoma defense allowed only 202 total yards in the game. He was drafted by the Kansas City Chiefs in the 5th round (144th overall) of the 1976 NFL draft where he played three seasons and in 1979 he played one season with the Oilers.

He earned a dual scholarship to the University of Oklahoma, where he was a member of the 1974 National Championship Wrestling team. Elrod earned a degree in public relations and business administration and after his NFL career he worked in the personal health care business and well as radio hosting and analysis.

Elrod later became a radio talk show host at KOKC (AM) 1520, the flagship station for the University of Oklahoma located in Oklahoma City.

Elrod was killed in a car accident on December 12, 2016.
