= Lucious Selmon =

American football player and coach (born 1951)

No. 98
- Position: Nose guard

Personal information
- Born: March 19, 1951 (age 75); Eufaula, Oklahoma, U.S.

Career information
- High school: Eufaula (OK)
- College: Oklahoma
- NFL draft: 1974: 16th round, 399th overall pick

Career history

Playing
- Memphis Southmen (1974–1975)

Coaching
- Oklahoma (1976–1983) Defensive line coach; Oklahoma (1984–1994) Outside linebackers & defensive ends coach; Jacksonville Jaguars (1995–2001) Outside linebackers coach; Jacksonville Jaguars (2002) Defensive line coach; Michigan State (2005) Defensive line coach

Awards and highlights
- Unanimous All-American (1973); Second-team All-American (1972); Big Eight Defensive Player of the Year (1973); First-team All-Big Eight (1973)

Lucious Selmon (born March 15, 1951) is a collegiate and professional American football nose guard, and football coach. He began his coaching career in 1976 at his alma mater, the University of Oklahoma, and has also coached on professional teams. From 1995 to 2002, he was a coach for the Jacksonville Jaguars, and has also coached privately.

Born in Eufaula, Oklahoma, he had younger brothers Dewey Selmon and Lee Roy Selmon. In one period, all three were playing as defensive linemen at University of Oklahoma. Each of them became professional football players, with varying length of careers.

== Early life ==
He was one of nine children born to Lucious and Jessie Selmon, and was raised on a farm near Eufaula, Oklahoma. He started playing football at Eufaula High School, from where he entered University of Oklahoma in 1970.

== Collegiate career ==
Selmon played nose guard for the Oklahoma Sooners for coaches Chuck Fairbanks and Barry Switzer. He was a unanimous All-American in 1973, and was named Chevrolet/ABC National Defensive Player of the Year, Big 8 Conference Athlete of the Year, and Big 8 Conference Defensive Player of the Year. He finished second in balloting for the Outland Trophy and seventh in voting for the Heisman Trophy. He made 255 tackles, including 31 for losses (144 yards), during his career. Selmon graduated from Oklahoma with a degree in special education in 1974.

Selmon's younger brothers, Dewey and Lee Roy, joined him at the University of Oklahoma and in one period, all three played as defensive linemen. Dewey and Lee Roy were both named consensus All-Americans in 1975, and both were drafted by the Tampa Bay Buccaneers in the 1976 NFL draft. Lee Roy won the Outland Trophy and Lombardi Award, and in 1995 he was the Sooners' first inductee in the Pro Football Hall of Fame. Although more than 40 years has passed since the Selmons played for Oklahoma, Oklahoma fans still say (referring to the Selmon brothers' parents), "God bless Mr. and Mrs. Selmon" or "Thank you, Mrs. Selmon."

== Professional and coaching career ==
Selmon was drafted in the 16th round of the 1974 NFL draft by the New England Patriots. He played two years as a defensive tackle for the Memphis Southmen (1974–75) in the World Football League. He returned to Oklahoma as an assistant coach at Switzer's invitation.

At Oklahoma, Selmon worked 13 seasons under Barry Switzer (1976–88) and six more under Gary Gibbs (1989–94). He coached the Sooner defensive line from 1976 to 1983. From 1984 to 1994, he took over duties as outside linebackers and defensive ends coach. Selmon helped develop four players who later earned All-America honors: nose guard Reggie Kinlaw, Rick Bryan, Kevin Murphy and defensive end Darrell Reed. He participated in the NFL's Minority Coaching Fellowship Program from 1980 to 1989, and worked with the Denver Broncos' linebackers and defensive ends.

Selmon went to work as an assistant coach for Tom Coughlin and the Jacksonville Jaguars in 1995. Selmon tutored the outside linebackers from 1995 to 2001 before taking over the defensive line in 2002. Two Jaguars, outside linebacker Kevin Hardy and defensive end Tony Brackens, earned 'All-Pro' honors.

In 2005, after working in football camps around the United States, Selmon joined the staff of the Michigan State Spartans as defensive line coach. He left Michigan State after one season for the Oakland Raiders. He worked as a private consultant to aspiring professional football players for two years.

In 2007 Selmon applied for the head coaching position at the University of Central Oklahoma, but he was not hired. Selmon resides with his family in Jacksonville.
