= Kyle Davis (American football) =

American football player (born 1952)

No. 57, 64
- Position: Center

Personal information
- Born: October 1, 1952 (age 74); Cordell, Oklahoma, U.S.
- Listed height: 6 ft 4 in (1.93 m)
- Listed weight: 240 lb (109 kg)

Career information
- High school: Altus (OK)
- College: Oklahoma
- NFL draft: 1975: 5th round, 113th overall pick

Career history
- Dallas Cowboys (1975–1976); Minnesota Vikings (1977)*; New England Patriots (1978)*; Detroit Lions (1978)*; San Francisco 49ers (1978); New York Giants (1979)*
- * Offseason or practice squad member only

Awards and highlights
- National champion (1974); Third-team All-American (1974); Second-team All-Big Eight (1974)

Career NFL statistics
- Games played: 21
- Stats at Pro Football Reference

Kyle Wayne Davis (October 1, 1952) is an American former professional football player who was a center in the National Football League (NFL) for the Dallas Cowboys and San Francisco 49ers. He played college football for the Oklahoma Sooners and was selected by the Cowboys in the fifth round of the 1975 NFL draft.

== Early life ==
Davis attended Altus High School before moving on to the University of Oklahoma. He spent his first two years as a backup at center, behind All-American Tom Brahaney.

As a junior, he was named the starting center after Brahaney graduated.

As a senior, he was a key part of the school's championship team, receiving third-team All-American and second-team All-Big Eight honors. He was considered a powerful blocker in the team's record-setting wishbone offense and also served as a long snapper.

== Professional career ==
=== Dallas Cowboys ===
Davis was selected by the Dallas Cowboys in the fifth round (113th overall) of the 1975 NFL draft, also known as the Dirty Dozen draft. As a rookie, he was the backup center and was used mainly on special teams and as a long snapper.

In the divisional playoffs against the Minnesota Vikings, when John Fitzgerald hurt his right elbow and had trouble snapping the ball in the shotgun formation, Davis took over the center duties in the last minutes of the game with a 14-10 deficit. Roger Staubach proceeded to hit Drew Pearson on a sideline route to convert a 4th-and-16 play and then both connected again on the famous Hail Mary pass.

In 1976, he was lost for the season with a knee injury and was placed on the injured reserve list on August 23. He was waived on August 1, 1977.

=== Minnesota Vikings ===
On August 9, 1977, he was claimed off waivers by the Minnesota Vikings. He was released on September 13.

=== New England Patriots ===
On May 3, 1978, he signed with the New England Patriots, but was waived to make room for Bob McKay on August 15.

=== Detroit Lions ===
On August 17, 1978, he was claimed him off waivers by the Detroit Lions. He was released before the season started.

=== San Francisco 49ers ===
On November 3, 1978, he signed with the San Francisco 49ers and got a chance to play in 7 regular season games. He was waived on August 1, 1979.

=== New York Giants ===
On August 6, 1979, the New York Giants claimed him off waivers. He was released on August 13.
