= Lee Gross =

American football player (born 1953)

No. 56, 52
- Position: Center

Personal information
- Born: July 29, 1953 (age 73); Montgomery, Alabama, U.S.
- Listed height: 6 ft 3 in (1.91 m)
- Listed weight: 237 lb (108 kg)

Career information
- College: Auburn
- NFL draft: 1975: 2nd round, 32nd overall pick

Career history
- New Orleans Saints (1975–1977); Baltimore Colts (1979)

Awards and highlights
- First-team All-SEC (1974); Second-team All-SEC (1973)

Career NFL statistics
- Games played: 48
- Fumble recoveries: 1
- Stats at Pro Football Reference

Lee Monroe Gross III (born July 29, 1953) is an American former professional football player who was a center for four seasons in the National Football League (NFL). He was selected in the second round of the 1975 NFL draft after playing college football for the Auburn Tigers. He spent three seasons with the New Orleans Saints from 1975 to 1977 and one with the Baltimore Colts in 1979.

Gross has two sons. His older son, Lee, played football for the Texas Christian University in the mid-1990s. His younger is former Major League Baseball outfielder and current Auburn Tigers assistant baseball coach Gabe Gross.
