= Randy Hughes =

American football player (born 1953)

No. 42
- Position: Safety

Personal information
- Born: April 3, 1953 (age 73); Oklahoma City, Oklahoma, U.S.
- Listed height: 6 ft 4 in (1.93 m)
- Listed weight: 209 lb (95 kg)

Career information
- High school: Tulsa (OK) Memorial
- College: Oklahoma
- NFL draft: 1975: 4th round, 96th overall pick

Career history
- Dallas Cowboys (1975–1980)

Awards and highlights
- Super Bowl champion (XII); National champion (1974); First-team All-American (1974); All-Time Big Eight Team; Big Eight 1970s All-Decade Team; 2× First-team All-Big Eight (1973, 1974)

Career NFL statistics
- Games played: 77
- Interceptions: 9
- Fumble recoveries: 6
- Sacks: 3.5
- Stats at Pro Football Reference

James Randell Hughes (born April 3, 1953) is an American former professional football player who was a safety for the Dallas Cowboys of the National Football League (NFL). He played college football for the Oklahoma Sooners and was selected in the fourth round of the 1975 NFL draft.

== Early life ==
Hughes attended Tulsa Memorial High School. He was a defensive back and wore lucky #13 jersey. As a senior, he was chosen by the Tulsa World newspaper as the Prep Player of the Year, becoming the first defensive back to ever win the award.

== College career ==
Hughes accepted a football scholarship from the University of Oklahoma. He was a safety and wore jersey #19.

As a junior in 1973, he earned the starting strong safety position for the University of Oklahoma, leading the team in interceptions (5) and being named All-Big Eight.

As a senior in 1974, he played a key role against Nebraska, when he intercepted three passes and had 11 tackles in a 28–14 victory. It was the team's second straight Big Eight championship, en route to an undefeated season and the National Championship. As a senior, he was named All-Big Eight, first-team All-American, National Football Foundation National Scholar-Athlete, GTE/CoSIDA Academic All-American and also played in the Senior Bowl.

Hughes finished his career after being a part of three Big Eight Conference titles, one National Championship, finishing fourth in school history with 14 career interceptions and tying the record for passes broken up in a season with 12 (1974).

In 1979, he was voted to the seventies All-Decade Big Eight Team. In 1995, he was named to the All-Time Big Eight Team.

== Professional career ==
Hughes was selected by the Dallas Cowboys in the fourth round (96th overall) of the 1975 NFL draft. He was one of 12 rookies who made the team that year - hence the "Dirty Dozen" nickname for the Cowboys 1975 draft, that helped the team reach Super Bowl X. From the start, his skills earned him comparisons to Cowboys great Cliff Harris.

Super Bowl XII was arguably his best game as a professional, registering 5 tackles, an interception and two fumbles recoveries, while earning MVP consideration.

During his first four seasons, he played mostly as a nickelback and served as the backup to Harris and Charlie Waters. In 1976, he had a chance to start 2 games after Harris was injured, and in 1979, he started in place of Waters, who sat out the entire year with an injured knee. On December 8 1979, he dislocated his right shoulder playing against the Philadelphia Eagles, which became an injury that eventually would end his career.

In 1980 he was the likely replacement for the retired Harris at free safety, but he missed most of the year, after reinjuring his right shoulder during pre-season and it being operated on twice. He was replaced in the starting lineup by Dennis Thurman.

In 1981 he was projected as a starter, but dislocated his right shoulder while playing against the Los Angeles Rams in pre-season. The injury would open the door for rookie Michael Downs to earn the free safety job and for Hughes decision to retire before the start of the regular season.

Although he played six seasons and recorded 9 interceptions with the Cowboys, his career never fully blossomed because of recurring shoulder injuries. He tied a team record with interceptions in 3 straight playoff games.

== Personal life ==
Hughes' son, Hampton Hughes, played defensive back for Boston College.
