= Mike Lemon =

American football player (born 1951)

No. 52, 54, 59
- Position: Linebacker

Personal information
- Born: February 26, 1951 (age 75); Topeka, Kansas, U.S.
- Listed height: 6 ft 2 in (1.88 m)
- Listed weight: 218 lb (99 kg)

Career information
- High school: Sioux City (IA) Bishop Heelan
- College: Kansas
- NFL draft: 1975: 6th round, 149th overall pick

Career history
- New Orleans Saints (1975); Denver Broncos (1975); Tampa Bay Buccaneers (1976–1977)

Awards and highlights
- 2× Second-team All-Big Eight (1973, 1974)
- Stats at Pro Football Reference

Michael Donald Lemon (born February 26, 1951) is an American former professional football linebacker who played from 1975 to 1977 for the New Orleans Saints, Denver Broncos and Tampa Bay Buccaneers of the National Football League (NFL). He attended Bishop Heelan Catholic High School before attending Ellsworth Community College and then the University of Kansas. He was selected by the Saints in the sixth round of the 1975 NFL draft.
