= Lee Roy Selmon =

American football player (1954–2011)

- Selmon with the Tampa Bay Buccaneers

No. 63
- Position: Defensive end

Personal information
- Born: October 20, 1954; Eufaula, Oklahoma, U.S.
- Died: September 4, 2011 (aged 56); Tampa, Florida, U.S.
- Listed height: 6 ft 3 in (1.91 m)
- Listed weight: 256 lb (116 kg)

Career information
- High school: Eufaula (OK)
- College: Oklahoma (1972–1975)
- NFL draft: 1976: 1st round, 1st overall pick

Career history
- Tampa Bay Buccaneers (1976–1984)

Awards and highlights
- NFL Defensive Player of the Year (1979); 3× First-team All-Pro (1979, 1980, 1982); 2× Second-team All-Pro (1978, 1984); 6× Pro Bowl (1979–1984); NFL 1980s All-Decade Team; NFL 100th Anniversary All-Time Team; Tampa Bay Buccaneers Ring of Honor; Tampa Stadium Krewe of Honor; Tampa Bay Buccaneers No. 63 retired; 2× National champion (1974, 1975); Outland Trophy (1975); Lombardi Award (1975); UPI Lineman of the Year (1975); Unanimous All-American (1975); First-team All-American (1974); Big Eight Defensive Player of the Year (1975); 2× First-team All-Big Eight (1974, 1975); Second-team AP All-Time All-American (2025)

Career NFL statistics
- Tackles: 742
- Sacks: 78.5
- Forced fumbles: 28.5
- Stats at Pro Football Reference
- Pro Football Hall of Fame
- College Football Hall of Fame

Lee Roy Selmon (October 20, 1954 – September 4, 2011) was an American professional football player who was a defensive end for the Tampa Bay Buccaneers of the National Football League (NFL). He played college football as a defensive tackle at the University of Oklahoma, the youngest of three brothers to play football there.

He was a consensus All-American in 1974 and 1975 and a member of consecutive national championship teams for the Oklahoma Sooners in 1974 and 1975.

Selmon was selected by the expansion Buccaneers as the first overall pick in the 1976 NFL draft. He played in the NFL for nine seasons, from 1976 to 1984, all with the Buccaneers.

Selmon joined the athletic department at the University of South Florida in 1993 and served as the school's athletic director from 2001 to 2004. He was inducted into the College Football Hall of Fame in 1988, the Pro Football Hall of Fame in 1995, and the Oklahoma Hall of Fame in 2009.

== Early life ==
Selmon was the youngest of nine children of Lucious and Jessie Selmon, raised on a farm near Eufaula, Oklahoma. A National Honor Society member at Eufaula High School, he graduated in 1972 after playing football through high school. His two brothers also played football and went to the University of Oklahoma, which he attended and where he graduated.

== College career ==
In 1972, Selmon joined his brothers Lucious and Dewey Selmon in playing on the defensive line at the University of Oklahoma. He blossomed into a star in 1974, anchoring one of the best defenses in Oklahoma Sooners football history. The Sooners were national champions in 1974 and 1975. Selmon won the Lombardi Award and the Outland Trophy in 1975. Oklahoma head coach Barry Switzer called him the best player he ever coached, and College Football News placed him as the 21st-best college player of all time.

Selmon was known as "The Gentle Giant." In the fall of 1999, Selmon was named to the Sports Illustrated 'NCAA Football All-Century Team.'

Selmon was named a consensus All-American in 1974 and 1975 by Newspaper Enterprise Association. His list of achievements include the National Football Foundation Scholar-Athlete, GTE/CoSIDA Academic All-American, and Graduate Fellowship Winner National Football Foundation and Hall of Fame. The 1996 Walter Camp "Alumnus of the Year" was voted to the Oklahoma Sports Hall of Fame in 1992.

=== Statistics ===
Season		Tackles		Sacks		TFL	
	UT	AT	TT	Sack	YdsL	TFL	Yds
1972	5	6	11	3	16	1	?
1973	37	20	57	9	49	2	?
1974	65	60	125	18	71	1	?
1975	88	44	132	10	48	4	?
Career	195	130	325	40	184	8	?

== Professional career ==
In 1976, Selmon was the first player picked in the NFL draft, the first-ever pick for the expansion Tampa Bay Buccaneers. He was joined by his older brother, Dewey, who was a second-round pick of the Bucs. In his first year, Selmon won the team's 'Rookie of the Year' and MVP awards. Selmon played in six straight Pro Bowls and was named NFL Defensive Player of the Year in 1979. Buccaneer assistant Abe Gibron said, "Selmon has no peers" at defensive end, while former Detroit Lions coach Monte Clark compared him to "a grown man at work among a bunch of boys".

Selmon began his career on a team that lost its first 26 games in franchise history (including a winless inaugural season) and only won a total of seven games in his first three seasons. However, he helped the Bucs rebound to three playoff appearances in four years from 1979 to 1982.

A back injury forced him to leave at the end of the 1984 season; the Bucs retired his number, 63, in 1986. He was elected to the Florida Sports Hall of Fame. In January 2008, Selmon was voted by a panel of former NFL players and coaches to Pro Football Weekly's All-Time 3-4 defensive team along with Harry Carson, Curley Culp, Randy Gradishar, Howie Long, Lawrence Taylor and Andre Tippett. He was the first player to be inducted into the Tampa Bay Buccaneers' Ring of Honor on November 8, 2009.

== After football ==
Selmon stayed in Tampa, Florida, working as a bank executive and being active in many charities.

From 1993 to 2001, Selmon served as an assistant athletic director at the University of South Florida under Paul Griffin. After Griffin was forced to resign, Selmon was promoted to take over the athletic department. As the USF Athletic Director, Selmon launched the football program, spearheaded the construction of a new athletic facility, and led the university's move into Conference USA, and into the Big East Conference.

Citing health issues, Selmon resigned as the USF Athletic Director in 2004. He took the role as president of the USF Foundation Partnership for Athletics, an athletics fund-raising organization.

== Awards and honors ==
- Selmon was inducted into the College Football Hall of Fame in 1988.
- In 1995, he was inducted into the Pro Football Hall of Fame, becoming the first Hall of Famer to have earned his credentials primarily in Tampa Bay. (He was later joined by Warren Sapp in 2013, Derrick Brooks in 2014, John Lynch in 2021 and Ronde Barber in 2023.)
- Also in 1995, Selmon became the first Buccaneer, former or current, to participate in a Super Bowl when he joined the coin toss ceremonies for Super Bowl XXIX, joining fellow Class of 1995 members Kellen Winslow and then-U.S. Congressman Steve Largent who flipped the coin to end the ceremonies, along with 75th Anniversary team members Ray Nitschke (representing Henry Jordan who was inducted posthumously), Mean Joe Greene, Otto Graham and Gale Sayers.
- In 2010, he was ranked #98 on the top 100 greatest players of all time, as surveyed by NFL Network.
- In 2012, Selmon was posthumously inducted into the University of South Florida Athletic Hall of Fame.
- The Lee Roy Selmon Expressway is named for him.
- The chain restaurants, Lee Roy Selmon's, was named for him. As of 2018, all seven locations were no longer in business.

== Death ==
Selmon suffered a massive stroke on September 2, 2011, which left him hospitalized in extremely critical condition. His restaurant initially released a statement announcing his death; however, this was later confirmed to be false. In fact, at one point his condition was said to be improving.

On September 4, 2011, Selmon died at the age of 56 from complications of the stroke. Visitation was scheduled for the following Thursday at the Exciting Central Tampa Baptist Church. The funeral was held the next day at Idlewild Baptist Church. Former teammates, the current Buccaneer team, the USF football team, other members of the NFL, and the general public attended. The USF football team wore a #63 decal on their helmets for the 2011 season, as did the Tampa Bay Buccaneers. Both teams conducted a ceremony to honor Selmon the weekend following his death. He is buried in Trice Hill Cemetery in Oklahoma City, Oklahoma.
