= Eufaula High School (Eufaula, Oklahoma) =

Coordinates: 35.287321°N 95.582485°W

- 1st and Woodland; Eufaula, Oklahoma 74432-2410; United States

Information
- Type: Co-educational, public, secondary
- School district: Eufaula Public Schools
- Authority: OSDE
- Superintendent: Jeanette Smith
- Principal: Heather Combs
- Teaching staff: 26.67 (FTE)
- Grades: 9-12
- Enrollment: 396 (2023–2024)
- Student to teacher ratio: 14.85
- Colors: Maroon and white
- Mascot: Ironhead
- Website: Eufaula Ironheads

Eufaula High School is a secondary school in Eufaula, Oklahoma, United States that is operated by Eufaula Public Schools. It serves grades 9 through 12.

== Notable alumni ==
- Dewey Selmon - linebacker University of Oklahoma, played in the NFL for Tampa Bay Buccaneers (1976–1981) and San Diego Chargers (1982)
- Lee Roy Selmon - defensive End University of Oklahoma, played in the NFL for Tampa Bay Buccaneers (1976–1984), member of the College Football Hall of Fame and the Pro Football Hall of Fame
- Lucious Selmon - noseguard at University of Oklahoma, played in the World Football League for Memphis Southmen (1974–1975), former coach at the college and pro levels
- J. C. Watts - quarterback at University of Oklahoma, played in CFL for Ottawa Rough Riders (1981–1986) and Toronto Argonauts (1986), former U.S. representative (1995–2003)
