= John Roush (American football) =

American football player (born 1953)

No. 62
- Position: Offensive guard

Personal information
- Born: January 7, 1953 (age 73)
- Listed height: 5 ft 11 in (1.80 m)
- Listed weight: 248 lb (112 kg)

Career information
- College: University of Oklahoma
- NFL draft: 1975: 15th round, 370th overall pick

Career history
- 1974: Oklahoma Sooners

Awards and highlights
- National champion (1974); Consensus All-American (1974); 2× First-team All-Big Eight (1973, 1974)

John Roush (born January 7, 1953) is an American former football player. He attended the University of Oklahoma and played at the offensive guard position for the Oklahoma Sooners football team. He was a member of the 1974 team coached by Barry Switzer that compiled an 11–0 record and won the national championship. He was also a consensus first-team selection to the 1974 College Football All-America Team. He was also an Academic All-America selection in 1974.
