= Emmett Edwards =

American football player (born 1952)

No. 87, 86
- Position: Wide receiver

Personal information
- Born: June 6, 1952 (age 74); Tulsa, Oklahoma, U.S.
- Listed height: 6 ft 1 in (1.85 m)
- Listed weight: 187 lb (85 kg)

Career information
- High school: Central (MO)
- College: Kansas
- NFL draft: 1975: 2nd round, 40th overall pick

Career history
- Houston Oilers (1975–1976); Buffalo Bills (1976)

Awards and highlights
- First-team All-Big Eight (1973); Second-team All-Big Eight (1974)

Career NFL statistics
- Receptions: 4
- Receiving yards: 75
- Stats at Pro Football Reference

Emmett Lee Edwards (born June 6, 1952) is an American former professional football player who was a wide receiver in the National Football League (NFL) for the Houston Oilers and Buffalo Bills. He played college football for the Kansas Jayhawks.

Competing for the Kansas Jayhawks track and field team, Edwards won the 1974 NCAA Division I Outdoor Track and Field Championships in the 4 × 110 yard relay.
