= Steve Rogers (American football) =

American football player (born 1953)

No. 26, 32
- Position: Running back

Personal information
- Born: August 26, 1953 (age 73); Jonesboro, Louisiana, U.S.
- Listed height: 6 ft 2 in (1.88 m)
- Listed weight: 203 lb (92 kg)

Career information
- High school: Ruston (LA)
- College: LSU
- NFL draft: 1975: 7th round, 163rd overall pick

Career history
- New Orleans Saints (1975); New York Jets (1976)
- Stats at Pro Football Reference

Steven Jerel Rogers (born August 26, 1953) is an American former professional football player who played as a running back in the National Football League (NFL). He played in the NFL for two seasons, one each with the New Orleans Saints and New York Jets. He had 62 yards rushing on 17 attempts in his pro career, all coming with the Saints.

Rogers was born in Jonesboro, Louisiana and attended Ruston High School. He attended college at Louisiana State University, where he played college football for the LSU Tigers football team. He rushed for 1,279 yards on 287 carries in his career at LSU and scored three touchdowns. He scored the Tigers' only touchdown in the team's 16–9 loss to Penn State in the 1974 Orange Bowl.
