= Kurt Schumacher (American football) =

American football player (1952–2023)

No. 71, 78
- Positions: Guard, tackle

Personal information
- Born: December 26, 1952; Cleveland, Ohio, U.S.
- Died: September 29, 2023 (aged 70); Southport, North Carolina, U.S.
- Listed height: 6 ft 3 in (1.91 m)
- Listed weight: 252 lb (114 kg)

Career information
- High school: Lorain (OH)
- College: Ohio State
- NFL draft: 1975: 1st round, 12th overall pick

Career history
- New Orleans Saints (1975–1977); Tampa Bay Buccaneers (1978)

Awards and highlights
- Consensus All-American (1974); 2× First-team All-Big Ten (1973, 1974)

Career NFL statistics
- Games played: 45
- Games started: 13
- Fumble recoveries: 2
- Stats at Pro Football Reference

Kurt Schumacher (December 26, 1952 – September 29, 2023) was an American professional football player who was a guard and tackle in the National Football League (NFL) for the New Orleans Saints and the Tampa Bay Buccaneers. He was selected by the Saints as the 12th overall pick in the first round of the 1975 NFL draft.

Schumacher died on September 29, 2023, at the age of 70.
