= 1976 Cleveland Browns season =

NFL team season

- Owner: Art Modell
- Head coach: Forrest Gregg
- Home stadium: Cleveland Municipal Stadium

Results
- Record: 9–5
- Division place: 3rd AFC Central
- Playoffs: Did not qualify
- Pro Bowlers: RB Greg Pruitt; DT Jerry Sherk

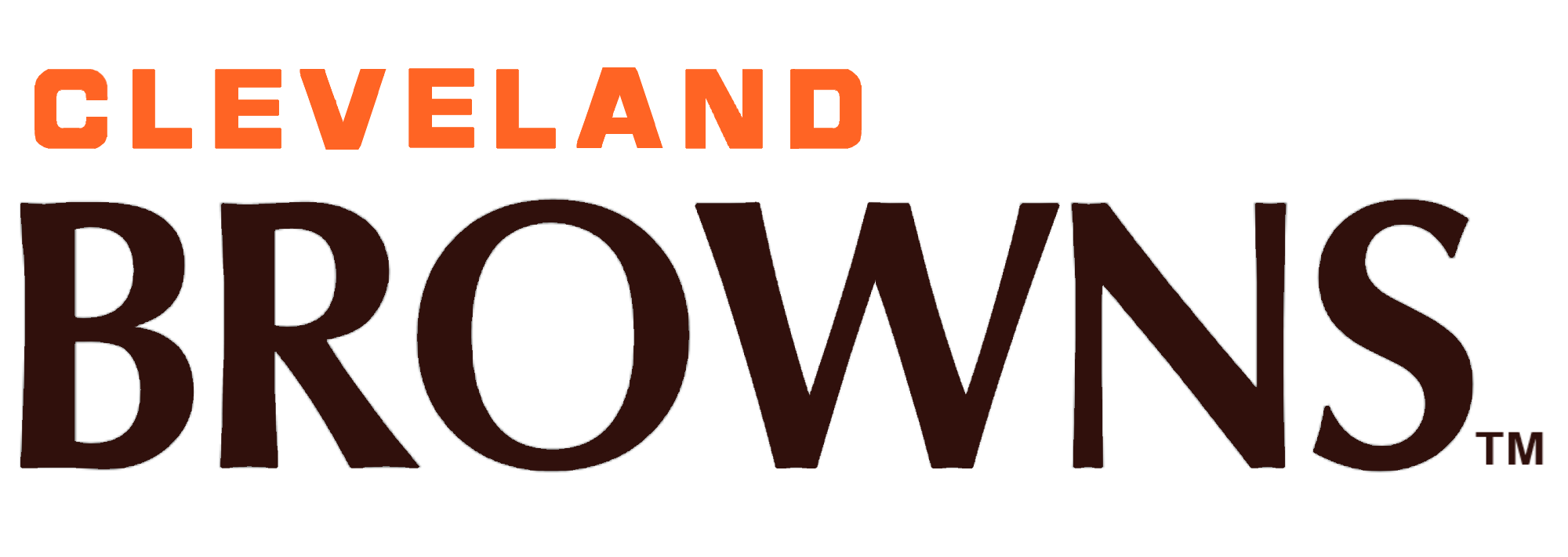
Primary script logo used by the Cleveland Browns, 1975-1995

The 1976 Cleveland Browns season was the franchise's 31st as a professional sports franchise and their 27th season as a member of the National Football League. The Browns were coached by second-year coach Forrest Gregg, and ended their season with a record of 9–5, being third in their division. The team's top draft choice was running back Mike Pruitt.

Brian Sipe firmly took control at quarterback. Sipe had been inserted into the lineup after a Mike Phipps injury in the season-opening win against the New York Jets on September 12. After a 1–3 start brought visions of another disastrous year, the Browns jolted the two-time defending Super Bowl champion Pittsburgh Steelers with an 18–16 victory on October 10. Third-string quarterback Dave Mays helped lead the team to that victory, while defensive end Joe "Turkey" Jones' pile-driving sack of quarterback Terry Bradshaw fueled the heated rivalry between the two teams. That win was the first of eight in the next nine weeks, helping put the Browns in contention for the AFC playoffs. A loss to the Kansas City Chiefs in the regular-season finale cost them a share of the division title, but running back Greg Pruitt continued his outstanding play by rushing for exactly 1,000 yards, his second-straight 1,000-yard season.

== Offseason ==
=== 1976 expansion draft ===
Cleveland Browns selected during the expansion draft
| Round | Overall | Name | Position | Expansion team |
|---|---|---|---|---|
| 0 | 0 | Carl Barisich | Defensive tackle | Seattle Seahawks |
| 0 | 0 | John Demarie | Guard | Seattle Seahawks |
| 0 | 0 | J. K. McKay | Wide receiver | Tampa Bay Buccaneers |

=== NFL draft ===
The following were selected in the 1976 NFL draft.

1976 Cleveland Browns draft
| Round | Selection | Player | Position | College | Notes |
|---|---|---|---|---|---|
| 1 | 7 | Mike Pruitt | Running back | Purdue | |
| 3 | 65 | Dave Logan | Wide receiver | Colorado | |
| 4 | 97 | Gene Swick | Quarterback | Toledo | |
| 4 | 99 | Mike St. Clair | Defensive end | Grambling | |
| 5 | 130 | Henry Sheppard | Guard | SMU | |
| 7 | 189 | Steve Cassidy | Defensive tackle | LSU | |
| 9 | 242 | James Reed | Running back | Mississippi | |
| 9 | 261 | Craig Nagel | Quarterback | Purdue | |
| 10 | 271 | Doug Kleber | Offensive tackle | Illinois | |
| 11 | 297 | Doug Celek | Defensive end | Kent State | |
| 13 | 354 | Brian Murray | Offensive tackle | Arizona | |
| 14 | 381 | Joe Smalzer | Tight end | Illinois | |
| 15 | 408 | Luther Philyaw | Defensive back | Loyola Marymount | |
| 16 | 438 | Chris Lorenzen | Defensive tackle | Arizona State | |
| 17 | 464 | Tom Fleming | Wide receiver | Dartmouth | |

=== Staff / Coaches ===
1976 Cleveland Browns staff
| Front office: Owner and president – Art Modell; Executive vice president/general manager – Harold Sauerbrai; Head coaches: Head coaches – Forrest Gregg; Offensive coaches: Running backs – George Sefcik; Wide receivers – Raymond Berry; Offensive line – Rod Humenuik | Defensive coaches: Defensive Coordinator - Dick Modzelewski; Linebackers – Walt Corey; Secondary / defensive backs – Billy Kinard; Special teams coaches: Special teams – Al Tabor; Film Coordinator - Ed Ulinski; Athletic Trainer - Leo Murphy |

=== Roster ===
1976 Cleveland Browns roster
| Quarterbacks: 10 Dave Mays; 15 Mike Phipps; 17 Brian Sipe; Running backs: 30 Cleo Miller; 34 Greg Pruitt; 35 Brian Duncan; 38 Larry Poole; 43 Mike Pruitt; Wide receivers: 26 Billy Lefear (IR); 33 Reggie Rucker; 42 Paul Warfield; 83 Ricky Feacher; 85 Dave Logan; 88 Steve Holden; Tight ends: 81 Oscar Roan; 84 Gary Parris | Offensive linemen: 54 Tom DeLeone C; 61 Al Dennis G; 63 Barry Darrow T; 65 Henry Sheppard G/T; 67 Chuck Hutchison G (IR); 68 Robert Jackson G; 69 Pete Adams G; 73 Doug Dieken T; 79 Gerry Sullivan T/C; Defensive linemen: 64 Joe Jones DE; 66 Earl Edwards DT; 70 Mack Mitchell DE; 71 Walter Johnson DT; 72 Jerry Sherk DT; 74 Mike St. Clair DE | Linebackers: 50 John Garlington OLB; 52 Dick Ambrose ILB; 55 Dave Graf ILB; 59 Charlie Hall OLB; 60 Bob Babich ILB; 86 Gerald Irons OLB; Defensive backs: 20 Tony Peters CB; 22 Clarence Scott CB; 23 Bill Craven FS; 24 Terry Brown SS; 27 Thom Darden FS; 28 Ron Bolton CB; 49 Neal Craig SS; Special teams: 12 Don Cockroft K/P; rookies in italics |

== Exhibition schedule ==
| Week | Date | Opponent | Result | Record | Venue | Attendance | Recap |
|---|---|---|---|---|---|---|---|
| 1 | July 31 | vs. Baltimore Colts | L 0–21 | 0–1 | Memorial Stadium (Lincoln) | 20,304 | Recap |
| 2 | August 7 | vs. Atlanta Falcons | W 31–7 | 1–1 | Lewis Field | 24,227 | Recap |
| 3 | August 16 | Minnesota Vikings | W 31–7 | 2–1 | Cleveland Stadium | 44,336 | Recap |
| 4 | August 23 | at Philadelphia Eagles | W 21–17 | 3–1 | Veterans Stadium | 20,600 | Recap |
| 5 | August 30 | New England Patriots | W 30–27 | 4–1 | Cleveland Stadium | 36,016 | Recap |
| 6 | September 3 | at Buffalo Bills | L 10–28 | 4–2 | Rich Stadium | 37,951 | Recap |

== Regular season schedule ==
| Week | Date | Opponent | Result | Record | Venue | Attendance | Recap |
|---|---|---|---|---|---|---|---|
| 1 | September 12 | **New York Jets** | **W** 38–17 | 1–0 | Cleveland Stadium | 67,496 | Recap |
| 2 | September 19 | at Pittsburgh Steelers | **L** 14–31 | 1–1 | Three Rivers Stadium | 49,169 | Recap |
| 3 | September 26 | at Denver Broncos | **L** 13–44 | 1–2 | Mile High Stadium | 62,775 | Recap |
| 4 | October 3 | **Cincinnati Bengals** | **L** 24–45 | 1–3 | Cleveland Stadium | 75,817 | Recap |
| 5 | October 10 | **Pittsburgh Steelers** | **W** 18–16 | 2–3 | Cleveland Stadium | 76,411 | Recap |
| 6 | October 17 | at Atlanta Falcons | **W** 20–17 | 3–3 | Atlanta Stadium | 33,364 | Recap |
| 7 | October 24 | San Diego Chargers | **W** 21–17 | 4–3 | Cleveland Stadium | 60,018 | Recap |
| 8 | October 31 | at **Cincinnati Bengals** | **L** 6–21 | 4–4 | Riverfront Stadium | 54,776 | Recap |
| 9 | November 7 | at **Houston Oilers** | **W** 21–7 | 5–4 | Astrodome | 39,828 | Recap |
| 10 | November 14 | Philadelphia Eagles | **W** 24–3 | 6–4 | Cleveland Stadium | 62,120 | Recap |
| 11 | November 21 | at Tampa Bay Buccaneers | **W** 24–7 | 7–4 | Tampa Stadium | 36,930 | Recap |
| 12 | November 28 | Miami Dolphins | **W** 17–13 | 8–4 | Cleveland Stadium | 74,715 | Recap |
| 13 | December 5 | **Houston Oilers** | **W** 13–10 | 9–4 | Cleveland Stadium | 56,025 | Recap |
| 14 | December 12 | at Kansas City Chiefs | **L** 14–39 | 9–5 | Arrowhead Stadium | 34,340 | Recap |
Note: Intra-division opponents are in **bold** text.

=== Standings ===
AFC Central
| | W | L | T | PCT | DIV | CONF | PF | PA | STK |
|---|---|---|---|---|---|---|---|---|---|
| ^{(3)} Pittsburgh Steelers | 10 | 4 | 0 | .714 | 5–1 | 9–3 | 342 | 138 | W9 |
| Cincinnati Bengals | 10 | 4 | 0 | .714 | 4–2 | 8–4 | 335 | 210 | W1 |
| Cleveland Browns | 9 | 5 | 0 | .643 | 3–3 | 7–5 | 267 | 287 | L1 |
| Houston Oilers | 5 | 9 | 0 | .357 | 0–6 | 3–9 | 222 | 273 | L2 |

== Game summaries ==
=== Week 5 vs Steelers ===
Week Five: Pittsburgh Steelers (1–3) at Cleveland Browns (1–3)

| Quarter | 1 | 2 | 3 | 4 | Total |
|---|---|---|---|---|---|
| Steelers | 7 | 3 | 0 | 6 | 16 |
| Browns | 3 | 3 | 9 | 3 | 18 |

at Cleveland Municipal Stadium, Cleveland, Ohio

- Date: October 10, 1976
- Game time: 1:00 p.m. EST
- Game weather: 48 °F (9 °C)
- Game attendance: 76,411
- Referee: Bernie Ulman
- TV: NBC
- Pro-Football-Reference.com

Game information

First quarter

- CLE – Don Cockroft 43-yard field goal. Browns 3–0. Drive:
- PIT – Franco Harris 1-yard run (Roy Gerela kick). Steelers 7–3. Drive:

Second quarter

- CLE – Don Cockroft 28-yard field goal. Steelers 7–6. Drive:
- PIT – Roy Gerela 30-yard field goal. Steelers 10–6. Drive:

Third quarter

- CLE – Cleo Miller 1-yard run (kick failed). Browns 12–10. Drive:
- CLE – Don Cockroft 50-yard field goal. Browns 15–10. Drive:

Fourth quarter

- CLE – Don Cockroft 40-yard field goal. Browns 18–10. Drive:
- PIT – Mike Kruczek 22-yard run (kick blocked). Browns 18–16. Drive:

Top passers

- PIT – Terry Bradshaw – 10/18, 75 yards, INT
- CLE – Brian Sipe – 4/14, 80 yards

Top rushers

- PIT – Franco Harris – 13 rushes, 39 yards, TD
- CLE – Greg Pruitt – 22 rushes, 76 yards

Top receivers

- PIT – Lynn Swann – 3 receptions, 74 yards
- CLE – Reggie Rucker – 3 receptions, 77 yards

Turkey Jones knocked out Terry Bradshaw in this contest.

=== Week 6: at Atlanta ===
Week 6: Cleveland Browns at Atlanta Falcons – Game summary

| Quarter | 1 | 2 | 3 | 4 | Total |
|---|---|---|---|---|---|
| Browns | 14 | 0 | 6 | 0 | 20 |
| Falcons | 0 | 14 | 3 | 0 | 17 |

at Atlanta–Fulton County Stadium, Atlanta

- Date: October 17
- Game time: 1:00 p.m. EDT
- Game weather: 57 °F (14 °C), relative humidity 78%, round (wind) 11 mph (18 km/h)
- Game attendance: 33,364
- TV announcers (NBC): Jay Randolph (play–by–play) and Floyd Little (color commentator)

Game information

First quarter

- CLE – Pruitt 1 yard rush (Cockroft kick)
  Browns 7, Falcons 0
- CLE – Miller 1 yard rush (Cockroft kick)
  Browns 14, Falcons 0

Second quarter

- ATL – Bean 23 yard rush (Mike-Mayer kick)
  Browns 14, Falcons 7
- ATL – Gilliam 18 yard pass from McQuilken (Mike-Mayer kick)
  Browns 14, Falcons 14

Third quarter

- ATL – Mike-Mayer 33 yard field goal
  Falcons 17, Browns 14
- CLE – Pruitt 2 yard rush (run failed)
  Browns 20, Falcons 17

Fourth quarter

- No scoring plays

Top passers

- CLE – Brian Sipe 12/18, 134 yds, 2 INT
- ATL – Kim McQuilken 15/28, 180 yds, 1 TD, 1 INT

Top rushers

- CLE – Greg Pruitt 26 carr, 191 yds, 2 TD
- ATL – Bubba Bean 14 carr, 54 yds, 1 TD

Top receivers

- CLE – Paul Warfield 4 rec, 69 yds
- ATL – Alfred Jenkins 6 rec, 74 yds

Turnovers

- CLE – 3
- ATL – 1
