= Dick Tressel =

American football coach

Biographical details
- Born: c. 1948; Columbus Ohio, U.S.

Playing career

Football
- c. 1969: Baldwin–Wallace

Baseball
- c. 1969: Baldwin–Wallace
- Positions: Defensive back (football); Second baseman (baseball)

Coaching career (HC unless noted)

Football
- 1970: Florida State (GA)
- 1971–1973: Gibsonburg HS (OH)
- 1974–1977: Wayne State (MI) (DC)
- 1978–2000: Hamline
- 2001–2003: Ohio State (associate DFO)
- 2004–2011: Ohio State (RB)

Administrative career (AD unless noted)
- 1978–2000: Hamline

Head coaching record
- Overall: 124–102–2 (college)

Accomplishments and honors

Championships
- 2 MIAC (1984, 1988)

Awards
- MIAC Coach of the Year (1984)

Dick Tressel (born c. 1948) is an American former football coach and college athletics administrator. He served as the head football coach at Hamline University in Saint Paul, Minnesota, from 1978 to 2000, compiling a record of 124–102–2. Tressel was also the athletic director at Hamline from 1979 to 2000. He then moved on to Ohio State University where he worked as an assistant football coach under his brother, Jim Tressel, from 2001 to 2010. Both brothers played college football for their father, Lee Tressel, at Baldwin Wallace University.

Tressel first head coaching position was at Gibsonburg High School in Gibsonburg, Ohio, where he coached future Ohio State All-American Ted Smith.

== Head coaching record ==
Year	Team	Overall	Conference	Standing	Bowl/playoffs
Hamline Pipers (Minnesota Intercollegiate Athletic Conference) (1978–2000)
1978	Hamline	5–4–1	3–4–1	6th	
1979	Hamline	5–5	3–5	6th	
1980	Hamline	5–4	5–3	T–3rd	
1981	Hamline	3–7	2–6	T–6th	
1982	Hamline	6–4	5–3	T–4th	
1983	Hamline	6–4	6–3	3rd	
1984	Hamline	9–0–1	8–0–1	1st	
1985	Hamline	4–6	4–5	T–5th	
1986	Hamline	4–6	4–5	T–6th	
1987	Hamline	6–4	5–4	T–4th	
1988	Hamline	9–1	8–1	T–1st	
1989	Hamline	6–4	5–4	T–4th	
1990	Hamline	7–3	6–3	T–3rd	
1991	Hamline	5–4	4–4	6th	
1992	Hamline	6–4	5–4	T–4th	
1993	Hamline	7–3	6–3	T–3rd	
1994	Hamline	8–2	7–2	2nd	
1995	Hamline	7–3	6–3	T–3rd	
1996	Hamline	5–5	4–5	T–5th	
1997	Hamline	5–5	4–5	7th	
1998	Hamline	2–8	2–7	T–7th	
1999	Hamline	2–8	1–8	T–8th	
2000	Hamline	2–8	2–7	8th	
Hamline:		124–102–2	105–94–2		
Total:		124–102–2			
National championship Conference title Conference division title or championship game berth
