= Hynoski =

Hynoski is a surname. Notable people with the surname include:

- Henry Hynoski (born 1988), American football player
- Henry Hynoski Sr. (born 1953), American football player
