= 1976 All-Southwest Conference football team =

American college football all-star team

The 1976 All-Southwest Conference football team consists of American football players chosen by various organizations for All-Southwest Conference teams for the 1976 NCAA Division I-A football season. The selectors for the 1976 season included the Associated Press (AP).

== Offensive selections ==
=== Quarterbacks ===
- Rodney Allison, Texas Tech (AP-1)
- Tommy Kramer, Rice (AP-2)

=== Running backs ===
- George Woodard, Texas A&M (AP-1)
- Ben Cowins, Arkansas (AP-1)
- Larry Isaac, Texas Tech (AP-1)
- Alois Blackwell, Houston (AP-2)
- Curtis Dickey, Texas A&M (AP-2)
- James Sykes, Rice (AP-2)

=== Tight ends ===
- Gary Haack, Texas A&M (AP-1)
- Eddie Foster, Houston (AP-2)

=== Wide receivers ===
- Mike Renfro, TCU (AP-1)
- Sammy Williams, Texas Tech (AP-2)

=== Guards ===
- Dennis Swilley, Texas A&M (AP-1)
- Mike Sears, Texas Tech (AP-1)
- Leotis Harris, Arkansas (AP-2)
- Charles Wilcox, Texas (AP-2)

=== Tackles ===
- Val Belcher, Houston (AP-1)
- Dan Irons, Texas Tech (AP-1)
- Danny Johnson, Rice (AP-2)
- Frank Myers, Texas A&M (AP-2)

=== Centers ===
- R. C. Thielemann, Arkansas (AP-1)
- Billy Gordon, Texas (AP-2)

== Defensive selections ==
=== Defensive ends ===
- Harold Buell, Texas Tech (AP-1)
- Tank Marshall, Texas A&M (AP-1)
- Johnnie Meadors, Arkansas (AP-2)

=== Defensive tackles ===
- Wilson Whitley, Houston (AP-1)
- Edgar Fields, Texas A&M (AP-1)
- Jimmy Dean, Texas A&M (AP-2)
- Harvey Hampton, Arkansas (AP-2)

=== Middle guard ===
- Gary Don Johnson, Baylor (AP-1)

=== Linebackers ===
- Robert Jackson, Texas A&M (AP-1)
- Thomas Howard Sr., Texas Tech (AP-1)
- Tim Black, Baylor (AP-1)
- David Hodge, Houston (AP-2)
- Bill Hamilton, Texas (AP-2)
- Paul Humphreys, Houston (AP-2)

=== Defensive backs ===
- Gary Green, Baylor (AP-1)
- Anthony Francis, Houston (AP-1)
- Greg Frazier, Texas Tech (AP-1)
- Mark Mohr, Houston (AP-2)
- Raymond Clayborn, Texas (AP-2)
- Lester Hayes, Texas A&M (AP-2)
- Mike Williams, Texas A&M (AP-2)

== Special teams ==
=== Placekicker ===
- Tony Franklin, Texas A&M (AP-1)

=== Punter ===
- Russell Erxleben, Texas (AP-1)

== Miscellaneous ==
- Offensive Player of the Year: Tommy Kramer, Rice (AP)
- Defensive Player of the Year: Wilson Whitley, Houston (AP)
- Coach of the Year: Bill Yeoman, Houston (AP)
- Newcomer of the Year: Curtis Dickey, Texas A&M (AP)

== Key ==
AP = Associated Press

== See also ==
1976 College Football All-America Team
