= 1975 All-East football team =

American college football all-star team

The 1975 All-East football team consists of American football players chosen by various selectors as the best players at each position among the Eastern colleges and universities during the 1975 NCAA Division I football season.

== Offense ==
=== Quarterback ===
- Mike Kruczek, Boston College (AP-1)
- Jim Kubacki, Harvard (AP-2; UPI-1)

=== Running backs ===
- Tony Dorsett, Pittsburgh (AP-1; UPI-1)
- Artie Owens, West Virginia (AP-1; UPI-1)
- Keith Barnette, Boston College (AP-1)
- Curt Edwards, Rutgers (AP-2; UPI-1)
- Bob Jackson, Navy (AP-2)
- Doug Jackson, Columbia (AP-2)

=== Tight end ===
- Jim Corbett, Pittsburgh (AP-1; UPI-1)
- Jeff Stempel, Temple (AP-2)

=== Wide receivers ===
- Gary Fencik, Yale (AP-1; UPI-1)
- Dave Quehl, Holy Cross (AP-2)

=== Tackles ===
- Dan Jiggetts, Harvard (AP-1; UPI-1)
- Dave Van Halanger, West Virginia (AP-1; UPI-1)
- Brad Benson, Penn State (AP-2)
- John Hanhauser, Pittsburgh (AP-2)

=== Guards ===
- Tom Rafferty, Penn State (AP-1; UPI-1)
- Pat Staub, Temple (AP-1)
- Bob Patton, Delaware (UPI-1)
- Tom Brzoza, Pittsburgh (AP-2)
- Tony Ray, Rutgers (AP-2)

=== Center ===
- Don Macek, Boston College (AP-1; UPI-1)
- Al Gluchoski, West Virginia (AP-2)

=== Placekicker ===
- Chris Bahr, Penn State (UPI-1)

== Defense ==
=== Ends ===
- Randy Cozens, Pittsburgh (AP-1; UPI-1)
- Nate Toran, Rutgers (AP-1)
- Ed McAleney, Massachusetts (UPI-1)
- Byron Hemingway, Boston College (AP-2)
- Dennis Zmudzin, Penn State (AP-2)

=== Tackles ===
- John Quinn, Penn State (AP-1; UPI-1)
- Peter Cronan, Boston College (AP-1)
- Rich Lukowski, West Virginia (UPI-1)
- John Alexander, Rutgers (AP-2)
- Gary Shugrue, Villanova (AP-2)

=== Middle guard ===
- Al Romano, Pittsburgh (AP-1)
- Joe Klecko, Temple (AP-2; UPI-1)

=== Linebackers ===
- Greg Buttle, Penn State (AP-1; UPI-1)
- Ray Preston, Syracuse (AP-1; UPI-1)
- Reggie Williams, Dartmouth (AP-1; UPI-1)
- Andy Bushak, Navy (AP-2)
- Steve Ramsey, Villanova (AP-2)
- John Smoot, Yale (AP-2)

=== Defensive backs ===
- Chet Moeller, Navy (AP-1; UPI-1)
- Dennis Moorhead, Pittsburgh (AP-1; UPI-1)
- Tom Odell, Penn State (AP-1; UPI-1)
- Mike Johnson, Penn State (AP-2)
- Larry King, Syracuse (AP-2)
- Al Staerkel, Army (AP-2)

== Key ==
- AP = Associated Press
- UPI = United Press International

== See also ==
- 1975 College Football All-America Team
