= Joe Campbell (American football, born 1955) =

American football player (1955–2023)

No. 73, 77, 79
- Position: Defensive end

Personal information
- Born: May 8, 1955; Wilmington, Delaware, U.S.
- Died: July 9, 2023 (aged 68); Eustis, Florida, U.S.
- Listed height: 6 ft 6 in (1.98 m)
- Listed weight: 254 lb (115 kg)

Career information
- High school: Salesianum (DE)
- College: Maryland
- NFL draft: 1977: 1st round, 7th overall pick

Career history
- New Orleans Saints (1977–1980); Oakland Raiders (1980-1981); Tampa Bay Buccaneers (1981)

Awards and highlights
- Super Bowl champion (XV); Consensus All-American (1976); 2× First-team All-ACC (1975, 1976)

Career NFL statistics
- Sacks: 8
- Fumble recoveries: 2
- Stats at Pro Football Reference

Joseph Patrick Campbell (May 8, 1955 – July 9, 2023) was an American professional football player who was a defensive end in the National Football League (NFL) from 1977 through 1981 for the New Orleans Saints, Oakland Raiders and Tampa Bay Buccaneers. He played college football for the Maryland Terrapins. In 1992, Campbell was inducted into the Delaware Sports Museum and Hall of Fame. Campbell also taught physical education at Ambassador University (TX) in the 1990s.

Campbell was found dead of an apparent heart attack while hiking in Eustis, Florida, on July 9, 2023. He was 68.
