= Nina McClelland =

American chemist (1929–2020)

- Born: August 21, 1929; Columbus, Ohio
- Died: August 16, 2020 (aged 90); Toledo, Ohio
- Education: B.Sc., M.Sc., University of Toledo; PhD., University of Michigan
- Scientific career
- Workplaces: University of Toledo
- Thesis: The effect of surface active agents on substrate utilization in an experimental activated sludge system. (1968)

Nina Irene McClelland (21 August 1929 – 16 August 2020) was an American chemist. She was dean emeritus and professor of chemistry at the University of Toledo.

== Early life and education ==
McClelland was raised by her mother Lillian McClelland, who worked as a foreign language teacher. Growing up, McClelland took vocal lessons and was taught six languages by her mother. McClelland's aunt, Fern Mervos, was a professor in the department of mathematics at the University of Toledo. McClelland says she was very close to her aunt and as a child would visit her at work.

McClelland graduated from Gibsonburg High School and pursued a degree in mathematics at the University of Toledo. She eventually earned her Bachelor of Science and Master of Science from the University of Toledo before graduating with a doctoral degree in environmental chemistry from the University of Michigan in 1968.

== Career ==
In 1967, while earning her PhD, McClelland became involved with the American Chemical Society. The next year, McClelland was named president and chief executive officer of the National Sanitation Foundation International. During her time at the National Sanitation Foundation, McClelland led the International Clean Water program and served on the National Academy of Sciences Committee on Water Treatment Chemicals. She also created a Water Quality Index to report water quality in lakes, rivers and streams. After the Safe Drinking Water Act was passed in the 1970s, McClelland also helped create the governmental standard for chemicals to treat drinking water. In 1986, McClelland sat on the U.S. Environmental Protection Agency Advisory Committee.

In 1991, McClelland was the recipient of the Walter S. Mangold Award from the National Environmental Health Association. In 1993, McClelland spoke in front of the United States Congress Committee on Environment and Public Works to promote cost-effective treatments to assist smaller, isolated communities in accessing clean drinking water. In 1995, McClelland was awarded chairwoman emeritus status and started her own, independent consulting firm. As well, McClelland was later elected American Chemical Society Board of Directors Chair.

McClelland was appointed an adjunct professor of chemistry at the University of Toledo in 2003. She was also the recipient of an honorary degree from the university. Two years later, she was honored with the Wham Leadership Medal from the American National Standards Institute. In 2008, McClelland was promoted to interim dean of the college of arts and sciences. Her duties included improving the college of arts and sciences strategic assessment. The interim honorific was dropped in 2010. She was also inducted into the Ohio Women's Hall of Fame. The following year, McClelland was named a Fellow of the American Chemical Society and retired.

In 2014, McClelland was the recipient of the University's Gold T Award for her "outstanding career accomplishment." Two years later, in 2016, McClelland was the recipient of the National Wildlife Federation's Women in Conservation Award for her contributions to promoting clean energy and protecting clean water supplies. She was also honored by the Sigma Xi Scientific Research Honor Society and granted a symbolic key to the city of Toledo. In April, McClelland was one of five women given the Dr. Alice H. Skeens Outstanding Woman Award.

In 2019, McClelland was honored in front of the United States Congress for her accomplishments in preserving clean water. The University of Toledo also dedicated a new Laboratory for Water Chemistry and Environmental Analysis in her name.

She died on August 16, 2020, at the age of 90.
