= Mike Voight =

American football player (1954–2012)

No. 31
- Position: Running back

Personal information
- Born: January 28, 1954; Norfolk, Virginia, U.S.
- Died: May 22, 2012 (aged 58); Chesapeake, Virginia, U.S.
- Listed height: 6 ft 0 in (1.83 m)
- Listed weight: 214 lb (97 kg)

Career information
- High school: Chesapeake (VA) Indian River
- College: North Carolina
- NFL draft: 1977: 3rd round, 76th overall pick

Career history
- Cincinnati Bengals (1977)*; Houston Oilers (1977)
- * Offseason or practice squad member only

Awards and highlights
- Second-team All-American (1976); 2× ACC Player of the Year (1975, 1976); 2× First-team All-ACC (1975, 1976); North Carolina Tar Heels Jersey No. 44 honored

Career NFL statistics
- Rushing yards: 20
- Average: 2.9
- Touchdowns: 0
- Stats at Pro Football Reference

Michael Ray Voight (February 28, 1954 – May 22, 2012) was an American professional football player who was a running back in the National Football League (NFL). He was selected by the Cincinnati Bengals in the third round of the 1977 NFL draft. He played college football for the North Carolina Tar Heels.
