= Raymond Clayborn =

American football player (born 1955)

No. 26
- Position: Cornerback

Personal information
- Born: January 2, 1955 (age 71); Fort Worth, Texas, U.S.
- Listed height: 6 ft 0 in (1.83 m)
- Listed weight: 186 lb (84 kg)

Career information
- High school: Trimble Tech (TX)
- College: Texas
- NFL draft: 1977: 1st round, 16th overall pick

Career history
- New England Patriots (1977–1989); Cleveland Browns (1990–1991)

Awards and highlights
- 3× First-team All-Pro (1977, 1983, 1986); Second-team All-Pro (1985); 3× Pro Bowl (1983, 1985, 1986); PFWA All-Rookie Team (1977); New England Patriots All-1970s Team; New England Patriots All-1980s Team; New England Patriots 35th Anniversary Team; New England Patriots Hall of Fame; All-American (1976); Track and Field All-American (1600m relay) - 1976; First-team All-SWC (1975); Second-team All-SWC (1976); Southwest Conference Football champion (1973, 1975); Southwest Conference Track and Field champion (1976, 1977); Southwest Conference Champion, 440-yard and mile relay teams (1976, 1977); 1975 Astro-Bluebonnet Bowl champion

Career NFL statistics
- Interceptions: 36
- Interception yards: 555
- Touchdowns: 1
- Return yards: 1,538
- Return touchdowns: 3
- Stats at Pro Football Reference

Raymond Dewayne Clayborn (born January 2, 1955) is an American former professional football player who was a cornerback for the New England Patriots from 1977 to 1989 and the Cleveland Browns from 1990 to 1991 of the National Football League (NFL). A three-time Pro Bowl and five-time All-Pro selection, he was the Patriots' starting cornerback in Super Bowl XX. Prior to the that he was an All-American defensive back and a running back/returner at the University of Texas.

== Early life ==
Clayborn was born in Fort Worth, TX and played high school football there at Green B. Trimble Technical High School.

== College career ==
=== Football ===
Clayborn played college football for the University of Texas at Austin as both a running back and defensive back where he was Texas' first four-year letterman, starting for the Longhorns from 1973 to 1976. He was the first player in school history have both a punt return touchdown and a kickoff return touchdown.

In 1973, against Arkansas, he had an 85-yard touchdown run that was the 4th longest in school history at the time. It was one of two 100 yard rushing games he had that year as he helped the Longhorns win the Southwest Conference Championship and go to the 1974 Cotton Bowl.

In 1974 he helped Texas get to the 1975 Gator Bowl.

In 1975 he made the All-Southwest Conference football team and helped Texas win a share of the Southwest Conference Championship and a trip to the 1975 Astro-Bluebonnet Bowl, which they won.

In 1976 he led the Southwest Conference in PR yards, yards per average punt return and punt return TDs. He again made the All-Southwest Conference football team and was also named a Sporting New and Newspaper Enterprise Association All-American and the team's MVP in 1976.

After the season was over he played in the 1977 East-West Shrine Bowl and the 1977 Hula Bowl.

Clayborn rushed for 529 yards and 8 touchdowns during his time at Texas, with an average of 6.4 yards per carry. He also returned 48 punts for 457 yards, 16 Kick offs for 329 yards and set the school record for return touchdowns with 3. Altogether he had 1369 all-purpose yards.

=== Track ===
Clayborn also ran track at Texas in 1976 and 1977, helping the track team with conference championships both year. He ran on the 440-yard and mile relay teams that won conference championships both years and set the school record in the event. In 1976 he was an All-American for the 1600m relay.

In 1991, he was inducted to the University of Texas Hall of Honor.

== Professional career ==
=== New England Patriots ===
Clayborn was a first round draft pick by the New England Patriots, going 16th overall (with a pick they got from San Francisco for quarterback Jim Plunkett) in the 1977 NFL draft. During his 14-year career, he made the Pro Bowl three times with the Patriots. From 1977 to 1982, he was paired with Hall of Fame player Mike Haynes. For his first three seasons, he also played kick returner.

As a rookie, he returned 28 kickoffs for 869 yards and a league-leading 3 touchdowns, giving him an NFL-best and Patriots franchise record 31.0 yards per return average.

Clayborn was a key player on four playoff teams, including 1978, 1982, 1986, and most notably 1985, recording a career-high six regular season interceptions (one for a touchdown) as the Patriots won three road playoff games en route to an improbable appearance in Super Bowl XX. In the Patriots' 31-14 Conference Championship win over the Miami Dolphins, Clayborn and the Patriots defense held Miami quarterback Dan Marino to just 20 completions and 248 yards on 48 passes. Clayborn made one of two Patriots interceptions during the upset. In the subsequent 46–10 loss against the Bears in Super Bowl XX, the Patriots were undone by turnovers and smothered by Chicago's crushing 46 defense. Though Bears quarterbacks completed only 12 passes for 258 yards with no touchdowns, New England's secondary was beaten several times on catches for big gains. Clayborn recovered one of two Chicago fumbles while watching his offense turn the ball over six times.

=== Cleveland Browns ===
In 1990, Clayborn became a free agent and signed a $1.8 Million 2-year contract with Cleveland, but his career there - where he recorded no interceptions - was less impressive than at New England. He missed almost all of the 1991 season with a leg injury. He finished the 1991 season as an unprotected Plan B player and decided to retire.

Clayborn finished his career with 36 interceptions, which he returned for 555 yards and a touchdown. He also returned 57 kickoffs for 1,538 yards and 3 touchdowns, and recovered 4 fumbles. At the time of his retirement, his 36 interceptions were a Patriots record, which has since been tied by Ty Law.

=== Legacy ===
He was elected to the New England Patriots Hall of Fame in 2017. On July 29, 2017, he signed a 1-day contract (at his request) prior to being inducted to officially retire as a New England Patriot.

Clayborn has been a Pro Football Hall of Fame nominee on several occasions (including 2008 and 2009), but has never advanced to a semi-finalist.

=== McDonough Incident ===
Clayborn was involved in an infamous incident early in the 1979 season involving Boston Globe reporter Will McDonough. Clayborn, who had twice been involved in fights with teammates the week leading up to a 56–3 rout of the New York Jets, began snapping at reporters in the locker room after the game and threatening them. When McDonough tried to intervene and settle the situation, Clayborn poked him in the eye; McDonough responded by punching Clayborn twice. The National Football League handed down a $2,000 fine to Clayborn for "conduct involving members of the news media" over the incident.

That followed another incident a week prior, in which Clayborn threatened Associated Press writer Bruce Lowitt for trying to ask Clayborn a question after the Patriots' season-opening loss to the Pittsburgh Steelers.

== Later life ==
As of 2010 he was the NFL Uniform Program Representative for the Houston Texans.

== See also ==
- List of Texas Longhorns football All-Americans
- List of New England Patriots first-round draft picks
