= Byron Hemingway =

American football player (born 1998)

No. 45
- Position: Linebacker

Personal information
- Born: June 16, 1954 (age 72); Newburgh, New York, U.S.
- Listed height: 6 ft 4 in (1.93 m)
- Listed weight: 210 lb (95 kg)

Career information
- High school: Newburgh Free Academy
- College: Boston College (1973–1976)
- NFL draft: 1977: 9th round, 224th overall pick

Career history
- Tampa Bay Buccaneers (1977)*; Hamilton Tiger-Cats (1977–1978); Seattle Seahawks (1979)*; Washington Redskins (1980)*
- * Offseason or practice squad member only

Awards and highlights
- First-team All-East (1976); Second-team All-East (1975)

Byron Joseph Hemingway (born June 16, 1954) is an American former professional football linebacker who played for the Hamilton Tiger-Cats of the Canadian Football League (CFL). He played college football at Boston College as a defensive end, and was selected by the Tampa Bay Buccaneers in the ninth round of the 1977 NFL draft.

== Early life ==
Byron Joseph Hemingway was born on June 16, 1954, in Newburgh, New York. He attended Newburgh Free Academy for high school.

== College career ==
Hemingway played college football for the Eagles of Boston College from 1973 to 1976, and was a four-year starter at defensive end. He earned Associated Press second-team All-East honors in 1975, and United Press International first-team All-East recognition in 1976. He returned an interception 25 yards for a touchdown in 1976. Hemingway also won several New England track titles and qualified for the IC4A Championships. He graduated from Boston College with a major in marketing and a minor in philosophy. He was inducted into the Boston College Varsity Club Athletic Hall of Fame in 2000.

== Professional career ==
Hemingway was selected by the Tampa Bay Buccaneers in the ninth round, with the 224th overall pick, of the 1977 NFL draft. He was released on September 12, 1977, before the start of the regular season.

Hemingway signed with the Hamilton Tiger-Cats of the Canadian Football League (CFL) on October 3, 1977. He dressed in five games for the Tiger-Cats during the 1977 CFL season, intercepting one pass and recovering one fumble. He started the first seven games for Hamilton in 1978 and recovered two fumbles. He was released on August 29, 1978, along with defensive end Angelo Wells and nose guard/linebacker Al Romano. Head coach John Payne said "They were all excellent athletes and it was a hard decision to make, but what we need is a pass rush and we need players who can give us that."

Hemingway signed with the Seattle Seahawks on February 15, 1979. He was later released on August 14, 1979.

Hemingway was signed by the Washington Redskins on May 25, 1980. He was released on July 29, 1980.

== Personal life ==
Hemingway attended graduate school at Pepperdine University. As of 2000, he was working as a marketing consultant for Loudeye Technologies in Seattle.
