= Jimmy Dean (American football) =

American football player (1955–2015)

- Dean, circa 1977

No. 66
- Position: Defensive end

Personal information
- Born: January 8, 1955; Bryan, Texas, U.S.
- Died: September 3, 2015 (aged 60); Texas, U.S.
- Listed height: 6 ft 4 in (1.93 m)
- Listed weight: 252 lb (114 kg)

Career information
- High school: Brazoswood (Clute, Texas)
- College: Texas A&M (1973–1976)
- NFL draft: 1977: 4th round, 86thth overall pick

Career history
- Buffalo Bills (1977)*; Houston Oilers (1977–1978)
- * Offseason or practice squad member only

Awards and highlights
- 2× Second-team All-SWC (1975, 1976)
- Stats at Pro Football Reference

James Daniel Dean Jr. (January 8, 1955 – September 3, 2015) was an American professional football defensive end who played for the Houston Oilers of the National Football League (NFL). He played college football for the Texas A&M Aggies and was selected by the Buffalo Bills in the fourth round of the 1977 NFL draft.

== Early life ==
James Daniel Dean Jr. was born on January 8, 1955, in Bryan, Texas. He played high school football at Brazoswood High School in Clute, Texas, as a two-way lineman. As a senior in 1972, he was named Greater Houston's High School Football Player of the Year by the Houston Chronicle. In the class of 1973, Dean was named the No. 2 overall prospect in Texas in a poll of Southwest Conference (SWC) coaches conducted by the Dallas Times Herald.

== College career ==
Dean enrolled at Texas A&M University to play college football for the Aggies. He was a four-year letterman from 1973 to 1976. He earned Associated Press second-team All-SWC honors at defensive tackle in both 1975 and 1976.

== Professional career ==
Dean was selected by the Buffalo Bills in the fourth round, with the 86th overall pick, of the 1977 NFL draft. He was waived on August 9, 1977, and then claimed off waivers by the Houston Oilers on August 11, 1977. However, he was later placed on injured reserve and missed the entire 1977 season. Dean played in the first three games for the Oilers in 1978 as a backup defensive end before being placed on season-ending injured reserve on September 22, 1978. He then had knee ligament surgery. Dean was released by the Oilers in July 1979 after failing a physical.

== Personal life ==
Dean worked in real estate and land development for over 20 years. He later worked at Leo Martin Chevrolet and Percheron Field Services. He died of cancer on September 3, 2015, in Texas.
