= 1974 All-Southwest Conference football team =

The 1974 All-Southwest Conference football team consists of American football players chosen, at each position, as the best players in the Southwest Conference during the 1974 NCAA Division I football season. The selectors for the 1974 season included the Associated Press (AP) and the United Press International (UPI).

== All Southwest selections ==
=== Offense ===
==== Quarterbacks ====
- Neal Jeffrey, Baylor (AP-1; UPI-1)
- Marty Akins, Texas (AP-2)

==== Running backs ====
- Steve Beaird, Baylor (AP-1; UPI-1)
- Bubba Bean, Texas A&M (AP-1; UPI-1)
- Earl Campbell, Texas (AP-1)
- Ike Forte, Arkansas (AP-2; UPI-1)
- David Bostick, SMU (AP-2)
- Larry Isaac, Texas Tech (AP-2)

==== Tight ends ====
- Oscar Roan, SMU (AP-1; UPI-1)

==== Split ends ====
- Lawrence Williams, Texas Tech (AP-1; UPI-1)
- Ed Lofton, Rice (AP-2)

==== Offensive tackles ====
- Bob Simmons, Texas (AP-1; UPI-1)
- Henry Sheppard, SMU (AP-1; UPI-1)
- Gary Gregory, Baylor (AP-2)
- Glenn Bujnoch, Texas A&M (AP-2)

==== Offensive guards ====
- Bruce Hebert, Texas (AP-1; UPI-1)
- Guy Thomas, SMU (AP-1; UPI-1)
- Billy Lemons, Texas A&M (AP-2)
- Rell Tipton, Baylor (AP-2)

==== Centers ====
- Aubrey Schultz, Baylor (AP-1; UPI-1)
- Ricky Seeker, Texas A&M (AP-2)

==== Kickers ====
- Randy Haddox, Texas A&M (AP-1; UPI-1)

=== Defense ===
==== Defensive ends ====
- Ivan Jordan, Arkansas (AP-1; UPI-1)
- Tommy Cones, Texas Tech (AP-1; UPI-1)
- Lionell Johnson, Texas (AP-2)
- Tim Black, Baylor (AP-2)

==== Defensive tackles ====
- Doug English, Texas (AP-1; UPI-1)
- Warren Trahan, Texas A&M (AP-1; UPI-1)
- Ecomet Burley, Texas Tech (AP-2)
- Jon Rhiddlehoover, Arkansas (AP-2)

==== Nose guard ====
- Louie Kelcher, SMU (AP-1; UPI-1)
- Cornelius Walker, Rice (AP-2)

==== Linebackers ====
- Ed Simonini, Texas A&M (AP-1; UPI-1)
- Derrel Luce, Baylor (AP-1; UPI-1)
- Dennis Winston, Arkansas (AP-2)
- Garth TenNapel, Texas A&M (AP-2)

==== Defensive backs ====
- Pat Thomas, Texas A&M (AP-1; UPI-1)
- Tim Gray, Texas A&M (AP-1; UPI-1)
- Ron Burns, Baylor (AP-1; UPI-1)
- Tom Turnipseede, Baylor (AP-1)
- Curtis Jordan, Texas Tech (AP-2; UPI-1)
- Ken Quesenberry, Baylor (AP-2)
- James Daniels, Texas A&M (AP-2)
- Mickey Earl, SMU (AP-2)

== Miscellaneous ==
- Offensive Player of the Year: Steve Beaird, Baylor and Neal Jeffrey, Baylor (AP)
- Defensive Player of the Year: Louis Kelcher, SMU (AP)
- Coach of the Year: Grant Teaff, Baylor (AP)
- Newcomer of the Year: Earl Campbell, Texas (AP)

== Key ==
AP = Associated Press

UPI = United Press International

Bold = Consensus first-team selection of both the AP and UPI

== See also ==
- 1974 College Football All-America Team
