= Bob Patton =

American football player (born 1954)

No. 65
- Position: Center

Personal information
- Born: October 21, 1954 (age 72); Camp Lejeune, North Carolina, U.S.
- Listed height: 6 ft 1 in (1.85 m)
- Listed weight: 245 lb (111 kg)

Career information
- College: Delaware
- NFL draft: 1976: undrafted

Career history
- Buffalo Bills (1976)

Awards and highlights
- First-team All-East (1975)

Career NFL statistics
- Games played: 12
- Stats at Pro Football Reference

Robert Thomas Patton (born October 21, 1954) is an American former professional football player who was a center for one season in the National Football League (NFL). He played high school football at West Side Central Catholic High School (later Bishop O'Reilly - now closed) in Kingston, Pennsylvania, where he was a teammate of NFL quarterback Joe Pisarcik. Patton played college football for the Delaware Fightin' Blue Hens, and he was signed by the Buffalo Bills as an undrafted free agent in 1976. He played in 12 games for the Bills in 1976. He retired after one season of playing.

== College career ==
Patton played college football at the University of Delaware for the Fightin' Blue Hens. He earned United Press International All-East honors as an offensive guard in 1975. He also earned the Robert C. Peoples Outstanding Senior Lineman award as a senior.

== Professional career ==
The Buffalo Bills signed Patton as an undrafted free agent on May 20, 1976. He played in 12 games for the Bills in 1976.
