= John Alexander (defensive end) =

American football player (born 1955)

No. 76
- Position: Defensive end

Personal information
- Born: November 12, 1955 (age 70); Hattiesburg, Mississippi, U.S.
- Listed height: 6 ft 2 in (1.88 m)
- Listed weight: 250 lb (113 kg)

Career information
- High school: Plainfield (Plainfield, New Jersey)
- College: Rutgers (1973–1976)
- NFL draft: 1977: 11th round, 291st overall pick

Career history
- Miami Dolphins (1977–1978); Washington Redskins (1980)*
- * Offseason or practice squad member only

Awards and highlights
- First-team All-East (1976); Second-team All-East (1975)
- Stats at Pro Football Reference

John Wesley Alexander (born November 12, 1955) is an American former professional football defensive end who played two seasons with the Miami Dolphins of the National Football League (NFL). He was selected by the Dolphins in the 11th round of the 1977 NFL draft after playing college football at Rutgers.

== Early life and college ==
John Wesley Alexander was born on November 12, 1955, in Hattiesburg, Mississippi. He attended Plainfield High School in Plainfield, New Jersey.

Alexander was a four-year letterman for the Rutgers Scarlet Knights of Rutgers University from 1973 to 1976. He earned Associated Press (AP) second-team All-East honors in 1975. In 1976, he was named first-team All-East by both United Press International and the AP. Alexander was inducted into the Rutgers Athletics Hall of Fame in 1992.

== Professional career ==
Alexander was selected by the Miami Dolphins in the 11th round, with the 291st overall pick, of the 1977 NFL draft. He was placed on the reserve/physically unable to perform list on July 13. He was activated on October 29, 1977, and played in four games for the Dolphins during the 1977 season. Alexander was released on August 29, 1978. He was re-signed on October 4, 1978, and appeared in eight games that year. He was released again on August 21, 1979.

Alexander signed with the Washington Redskins on April 8, 1980. He was released on July 24, 1980.
