= Don Buckey =

American football player (born 1953)

No. 84
- Position: Wide receiver

Personal information
- Born: November 9, 1953 (age 72); Akron, Ohio, U.S.
- Listed height: 5 ft 11 in (1.80 m)
- Listed weight: 180 lb (82 kg)

Career information
- High school: Kenmore (Akron)
- College: NC State
- NFL draft: 1976: 12th round, 7th overall pick

Career history
- New York Jets (1976)

Awards and highlights
- First-team All-American (1975); First-team All-ACC (1975)

Career NFL statistics
- Receptions: 5
- Receiving yards: 36
- Stats at Pro Football Reference

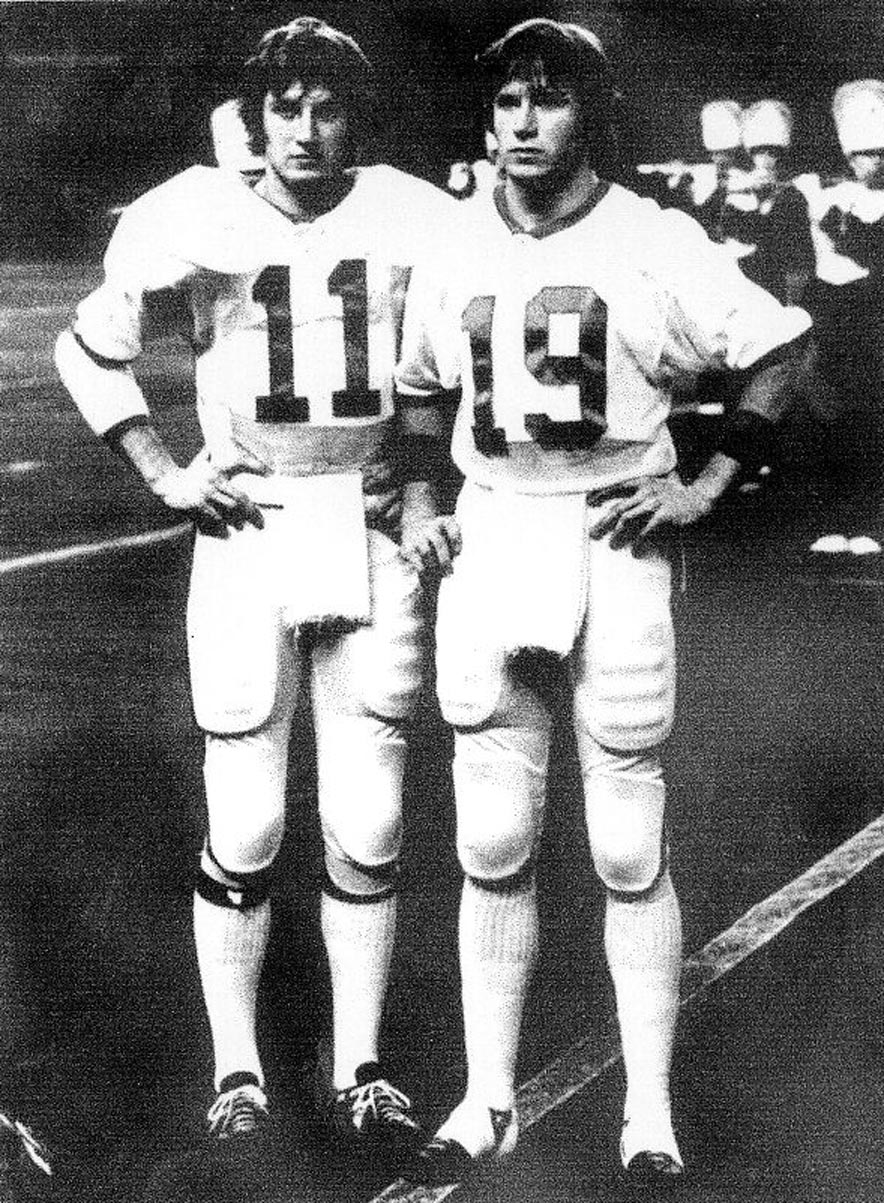
#19 Don Buckey and #11 Dave Buckey, 1974 Astro-Bluebonnet Bowl

Donald Charles Buckey (born November 9, 1953) is an American former professional football player who was a wide receiver for the New York Jets of the National Football League (NFL).

Buckey was the seventh player taken in the twelfth round of the 1976 NFL draft directly before his twin brother Dave Buckey. Don is the receiving half of NC State's Buckey Twins. Don was a member of the 1975 College Football All-America Team and the NC State Wolfpack football team.

== College career ==
Buckey played four years at North Carolina State University for head coach Lou Holtz, setting career receptions and receiving yardage records while playing with twin brother quarterback Dave. He led the team in receptions in 1973, ’74 and ’75 and his 102 career catches for 1,735 yards rank him fifth and fourth, respectively, on the all-time N.C. State list. He caught five touchdown passes in 1974, including two against Duke, and had a career-high 34 receptions and gained 551 yards in 1975. Don’s 17 yards per catch and total 1735 receiving yards put him fourth on the school’s career rankings in both categories. He started on the 1973 Atlantic Coast Conference championship team and was named first-team All-ACC and first-team All-American by the Football Writers Association in 1975.

With his brother, Dave, he appeared on the cover of Sports Illustrated magazine (October 30, 1972) They also played in four post-season bowl games, including two Peach Bowls, a Bluebonnet Bowl and a Liberty Bowl. He also played in the Hula Bowl and the Japan Bowl All-Star games.

== Professional career ==
The New York Jets selected him in the twelfth round of the 1976 NFL Draft and he played one year in the National Football League in Lou Holtz’s only year as a coach. At 6’0", Don gathered in five passes good for 36 yards in limited duty as a wide receiver in 1976.

Don and his twin Dave Buckey are both members of the Summit County, Ohio Hall of Fame, the Kenmore High School (Akron, OH) Wall of Fame, and the Atlantic Coast Conference (ACC) Legends class of 2013.

The Buckey twins played on two City Series championship teams for head coach Richard Fortner at Kenmore High School (Akron, OH) and played together in the Ohio-Pennsylvania Big 33 All-Star Game in 1972.

Don earned a Sport Pilot Certificate in 2006, currently owning and flying N293CT, a 2006 Flight Design CTsw light sport aircraft.

== Personal life ==
His family includes: Father, Carroll. Mother, Jessie. Brothers, Jim, Dan, and twin Dave. Sister, Carolyn McDaniel. He married Elaine Hartofelis Buckey, on May 22, 1976. They have had no children.

He is currently retired and living in The Villages, FL.
