= Tommy Marvaso =

American football player (born 1953)

No. 47
- Position: Defensive back

Personal information
- Born: October 2, 1953 (age 73); Washington, D.C., U.S.
- Listed height: 6 ft 1 in (1.85 m)
- Listed weight: 190 lb (86 kg)

Career information
- High school: St. John's College (Washington, D.C.)
- College: Cincinnati
- NFL draft: 1976: 6th round, 179th overall pick

Career history
- New York Jets (1976–1977)

Awards and highlights
- First-team All-American (1975)
- Stats at Pro Football Reference

Thomas Michael Marvaso (born October 2, 1953) is an American former professional football player who was a defensive back for the New York Jets of the National Football League (NFL). He played college football for the Cincinnati Bearcats, earning first-team All-American honors in 1975. He is a member of the University of Cincinnati Hall of Fame. He ranks fourth all-time for punt return touchdowns, and is a member of the Bearcat ring of honor.
