= Steve Niehaus =

American football player (born 1954)

No. 71
- Positions: Defensive tackle, defensive end

Personal information
- Born: September 25, 1954 (age 72); Cincinnati, Ohio, U.S.
- Listed height: 6 ft 4 in (1.93 m)
- Listed weight: 263 lb (119 kg)

Career information
- High school: Archbishop Moeller (Cincinnati)
- College: Notre Dame
- NFL draft: 1976: 1st round, 2nd overall pick

Career history
- Seattle Seahawks (1976–1978); Minnesota Vikings (1979)

Awards and highlights
- PFWA All-Rookie Team (1976); National champion (1973); Unanimous All-American (1975)

Career NFL statistics
- Sacks: 10.5
- Fumble recoveries: 1
- Stats at Pro Football Reference

Steve Niehaus (born September 25, 1954) is an American former professional football player who was a defensive tackle for four seasons in the National Football League (NFL). He played college football for the Notre Dame Fighting Irish. Niehaus was the first draft pick for the Seattle Seahawks and the second player taken in the 1976 NFL draft. Niehaus was the 1976 NFC Defensive Rookie of the Year and holds the Seahawk rookie record for sacks in a season with 9½.

He suffered multiple knee injuries which ended his career.
