= Neal Jeffrey =

American football player (born 1953)

No. 19
- Position: Quarterback

Personal information
- Born: July 23, 1953 (age 73); Fort Worth, Texas, U.S.
- Listed height: 6 ft 1 in (1.85 m)
- Listed weight: 180 lb (82 kg)

Career information
- High school: Overland Park (KS) Shawnee Mission South
- College: Baylor
- NFL draft: 1975: 17th round, 423rd overall pick

Career history
- San Diego Chargers (1976)

Awards and highlights
- SWC Offensive Player of the Year (1974); First-team All-SWC (1974); Second-team All-SWC (1973)
- Stats at Pro Football Reference

James Neal Jeffrey Jr. (born July 23, 1953) is an American former professional football player who was a quarterback or the San Diego Chargers of the National Football League (NFL) in 1976. He played college football for the Baylor Bears.
