= Bob Simmons (offensive lineman) =

American football player (born 1954)

No. 63, 65, 73
- Position: Guard

Personal information
- Born: July 7, 1954 (age 72); Temple, Texas, U.S.
- Listed height: 6 ft 4 in (1.93 m)
- Listed weight: 260 lb (118 kg)

Career information
- High school: Temple
- College: Texas
- NFL draft: 1976: 3rd round, 77th overall pick

Career history
- Kansas City Chiefs (1977–1983); Chicago Blitz (1984–1984)

Awards and highlights
- Consensus All-American (1975); First-team All-American (1974); 3× First-team All-SWC (1973, 1974, 1975)

Career NFL statistics
- Games played: 88
- Games started: 70
- Fumble recoveries: 1
- Stats at Pro Football Reference

Robert Gatling Simmons (born July 7, 1954) is an American former professional football player who was a guard in the National Football League (NFL). He played college football for the Texas Longhorns, earning consensus All-American honors in 1975. He was selected by the New Orleans Saints in the third round of the 1976 NFL draft.

Simmons also played for the Kansas City Chiefs and the Chicago Blitz of the United States Football League.
