= 1973 All-Southwest Conference football team =

American college football all-star team

The 1973 All-Southwest Conference football team consists of American football players chosen, at each position, as the best players in the Southwest Conference during the 1973 NCAA Division I football season. The selectors for the 1973 season included the Associated Press (AP) and the United Press International (UPI).

Texas running back Roosevelt Leaks set the conference single-season record with 1,415 rushing yards in 1973 and was selected as the player of the year by the AP and the offensive player of the year by the UPI.

The AP also conducted balloting for coach of the year (Jim Carlen, Texas Tech) and newcomer of the year (Larry Isaac, Texas Tech). And the UPI selected a defensive player of the year (linebacker Ed Simonini, Texas A&M) and a freshman player of the year (quarterback David Walker, Texas A&M).

== All Southwest selections ==
=== Offense ===
==== Quarterbacks ====
- Joe Barnes, Texas Tech (AP-1, UPI-1)
- Neal Jeffrey, Baylor (AP-2, UPI-2)

==== Running backs ====
- Roosevelt Leaks, Texas (AP-1, UPI-1)
- Dickey Morton, Arkansas (AP-1, UPI-1)
- Alvin Maxson, SMU (AP-1, UPI-2)
- Mike Luttrell, TCU (AP-2, UPI-1)
- Alvin Walker, Texas A&M (AP-2, UPI-2)
- Lawrence Williams, Texas Tech (AP-2, UPI-2)
- Gary Lacy, Baylor (UPI-2)

==== Tight ends ====
- Gary Butler, Rice (AP-1, UPI-1)
- Andre Tillman, Texas Tech (AP-1, UPI-1)
- Oscar Roan, SMU (AP-2, UPI-2)

==== Split ends ====
- Charles Dancer, Baylor (AP-1, UPI-1)
- Jack Ettinger, Arkansas (AP-2)

==== Offensive tackles ====
- Bob Simmons, Texas (AP-1, UPI-1)
- Tom Ferguson, Texas Tech (AP-1, UPI-1)
- Sammy Johnson, Rice (AP-2)
- Kelly Arnold, SMU (AP-2, UPI-2)
- Richard Mason, Baylor (UPI-2)

==== Offensive guards ====
- Don Crosslin, Texas (AP-1, UPI-1)
- Dennis Allen, Texas Tech (AP-1, UPI-1)
- Bruce Herbert, Texas (AP-2, UPI-2)
- Bruce Welch, Texas A&M (AP-2, UPI-2)

==== Centers ====
- Bill Wyman, Texas (AP-1, UPI-1)
- Ricky Seeker, Texas A&M (AP-2)

==== Kickers ====
- Don Grimes, Texas Tech (UPI-1)
- Mike Landrum, Rice (UPI-2)

=== Defense ===
==== Defensive ends ====
- Malcolm Minnick, Texas (AP-1, UPI-2)
- Ivan Jordan, Arkansas (AP-1)
- Jon Rhiddlehoover, Arkansas (AP-2, UP-1 [line])
- Charlie Davis, TCU (AP-2, UPI-1 [line])
- Bill Rutherford, Texas (AP-2, UPI-2)
- Charlie Adams, SMU (AP-2)

==== Defensive tackles ====
- Ecomet Burley, Texas Tech (AP-1, UPI-1 [line])
- Doug English, Texas (AP-1, UPI-1 [line])
- Joe Johnson, Baylor (UPI-2)

==== Nose guard ====
- David Knaus, Texas Tech (AP-1, UPI-2 [line])
- Cornelius Walker, Rice (AP-2, UPI-2)

==== Linebackers ====
- Ed Simonini, Texas A&M (AP-1, UPI-1)
- Danny Rhodes, Arkansas (AP-1, UPI-1)
- Dede Terveen, TCU (AP-2, UPI-1)
- David Johnston, Texas (AP-2)
- Wade Johnson, Texas (UPI-2)
- Glen Gaspard, Texas (UPI-2)

==== Defensive backs ====
- Bruce Henley, Rice (AP-1, UPI-1)
- Jay Arnold, Texas (AP-1, UPI-1)
- Danny Willis, Texas Tech (AP-1, UPI-1)
- Kenneth Wallace, Texas Tech (AP-1, UPI-1)
- Gene Hernandez, TCU (AP-2, UPI-2)
- Rollen Smith, Arkansas (AP-2, UPI-2)
- Tim Gray, Texas A&M (AP-2)
- Andy Duvall, SMU (AP-2, UPI-2)
- Preston Anderson, Rice (UPI-2)

== Key ==
AP = Associated Press

UPI = United Press International

Bold = Consensus first-team selection of both the AP and UPI

== See also ==
- 1973 College Football All-America Team
