= Bob Grupp =

American football player (born 1955)

No. 1
- Position: Punter

Personal information
- Born: May 8, 1955 (age 71); Philadelphia, Pennsylvania, U.S.
- Listed height: 5 ft 11 in (1.80 m)
- Listed weight: 193 lb (88 kg)

Career information
- High school: Neshaminy (PA)
- College: Duke
- NFL draft: 1977: 7th round, 171st overall pick

Career history
- Kansas City Chiefs (1979–1981); New Jersey Generals (1984)

Awards and highlights
- PFWA All-Rookie Team (1979); Pro Bowl (1979); PFW Golden Toe Award (1979); 2× First-team All-ACC (1975, 1976)

Career NFL statistics
- Punts: 214
- Punting yards: 8,756
- Punting average: 40.9
- Stats at Pro Football Reference

Robert William Grupp (born May 8, 1955) is an American former professional football player who was a punter for three seasons with the Kansas City Chiefs of the National Football League (NFL). He was chosen for the Pro Bowl after the 1979 season.

== Biography ==
Prior to his career in professional football, Grupp was a star quarterback at Neshaminy High School in Langhorne, PA. He also punted and was an all-Atlantic Coast Conference (ACC) cornerback at Duke University (class of 1977) where he also lettered as an outfielder on the baseball team during his junior and senior years. He was MVP of the 1977 Duke baseball team.

In 1984, he played with the New Jersey Generals of the United States Football League (USFL).
