= Gerald Skinner =

American football player (1954–2018)

No. 73
- Position: Offensive tackle

Personal information
- Born: September 12, 1954; Malvern, Arkansas, U.S.
- Died: November 17, 2018 (aged 64); Sheridan, Arkansas, U.S.
- Listed height: 6 ft 5 in (1.96 m)
- Listed weight: 270 lb (122 kg)

Career information
- High school: Malvern (AR)
- College: Arkansas
- NFL draft: 1977: 4th round, 109th overall pick

Career history
- Green Bay Packers (1978)

Awards and highlights
- Second-team All-SWC (1975); 1975 Southwest Conference co-championship; 1976 Cotton Bowl Classic championship

Career NFL statistics
- Games played: 15
- Stats at Pro Football Reference

Gerald Lynn Skinner (September 12, 1954 – November 17, 2018) was an American professional football player in the National Football League (NFL). He was selected by the New England Patriots in the fourth round of the 1977 NFL draft and later played with the Green Bay Packers during the 1978 NFL season.

Skinner was an All-SWC selection as an offensive tackle after his senior season at Arkansas. He helped the Razorbacks and head coach Frank Broyles win a share of the 1975 Southwest Conference Championship by beating #2 Texas A&M in the season finale. Arkansas would finish 10-2 and ranked in the Top Ten after a victory over the Georgia Bulldogs in the 1976 Cotton Bowl Classic.

After his playing days were over, Skinner earned a master's degree at the University of Central Arkansas, and spent a number of years as a teacher and football coach in Conway, Arkansas. He would go on to be a project manager for Fort Smith Glass Company and Overhead Door.

Skinner died unexpectedly from a heart attack. Memorial contributions were made to the American Heart Association in his honor.
