= Scott Bull =

American football player (born 1953)

No. 19
- Position: Quarterback

Personal information
- Born: June 8, 1953 (age 73); Camden, Arkansas, U.S.
- Listed height: 6 ft 5 in (1.96 m)
- Listed weight: 211 lb (96 kg)

Career information
- High school: Jonesboro (AR)
- College: Arkansas
- NFL draft: 1976: 6th round, 177th overall pick

Career history
- San Francisco 49ers (1976–1978)

Awards and highlights
- Second-team All-SWC (1975)

Career NFL statistics
- Passing attempts: 193
- Passing completions: 76
- Completion percentage: 39.4%
- TD–INT: 3-17
- Passing yards: 992
- Passer rating: 24.8
- Stats at Pro Football Reference

John Scott Bull (born June 8, 1953) is an American former professional football player, spending three seasons as a quarterback with the San Francisco 49ers. He played college football at the University of Arkansas.

In his NFL career, Bull completed 76 of 193 passes for 3 touchdowns. A strong running quarterback, he rushed for 186 yards in 46 attempts and three touchdowns in his three-year professional career. Bull saw his most extensive action in 1978. He spent 1979 on injured reserve with a knee injury suffered in the final game of the 1978 season.
