= 1975 All-Southwest Conference football team =

American college football all-star team

The 1975 All-Southwest Conference football team consists of American football players chosen by various organizations for All-Southwest Conference teams for the 1975 NCAA Division I football season. The selectors for the 1975 season included the Associated Press (AP).

== All Southwest selections ==
=== Offense ===
==== Split ends ====
- Mike Renfro, TCU (AP-1)
- Ed Lofton, Rice (AP-2)

==== Tackles ====
- Bob Simmons, Texas (AP-1)
- Henry Sheppard, SMU (AP-1)
- Gerald Skinner, Arkansas (AP-2)
- Glenn Bujnoch, Texas A&M (AP-2)

==== Guards ====
- R. C. Thielemann, Arkansas (AP-1)
- Will Wilcox, Texas (AP-1)
- Guy Thomas, SMU (AP-2)
- Bruce Welch, Texas A&M (AP-2)

==== Centers ====
- Richard LaFargue, Arkansas (AP-1)
- Billy Gordon, Texas (AP-2)

==== Tight ends ====
- Pat Felux, Texas Tech (AP-1)
- Richard Osborne, Texas A&M (AP-2)

==== Quarterbacks ====
- Marty Akins, Texas (AP-1)
- Scott Bull, Arkansas (AP-2)

==== Running backs ====
- Earl Campbell, Texas (AP-1)
- Bubba Bean, Texas A&M (AP-1)
- Ike Forte, Arkansas (AP-1)
- Wayne Morris, SMU (AP-2)
- Cleveland Franklin, Baylor (AP-2)
- Jerry Eckwood, Arkansas (AP-2)

=== Defense ===
==== Defensive ends ====
- Blake Schwarz, Texas A&M (AP-1)
- Johnnie Meadors, Arkansas (AP-1)
- Tank Marshall, Texas A&M (AP-2)
- Tim Campbell, Texas (AP-2)

==== Defensive tackles ====
- Edgar Fields, Texas A&M (AP-1)
- Brad Shearer, Texas (AP-1)
- Jimmy Dean, Texas A&M (AP-2)
- Wharton Foster, Baylor (AP-2)

==== Nose guards ====
- Ecomet Burley, Texas Tech (AP-1)

==== Linebackers ====
- Ed Simonini, Texas A&M (AP-1)
- Garth TenNapel, Texas A&M (AP-1)
- Bill Hamilton, Texas (AP-1)
- Rodney Norton, Rice (AP-2)
- Robert Jackson, Texas A&M (AP-2)
- Rick Fenlaw, Texas (AP-2)

==== Defensive backs ====
- Pat Thomas, Texas A&M (AP-1)
- Raymond Clayborn, Texas (AP-1)
- Lester Hayes, Texas A&M (AP-1)
- Jackie Williams, Texas A&M (AP-1)
- Ronald Burns, Baylor (AP-2)
- Curtis Jordan, Texas Tech (AP-2)
- Bo Busby, Arkansas (AP-2)
- Tim Pulliam, TCU (AP-2)

=== Special teams ===
==== Punters ====
- Russell Erxleben, Texas (AP-1)

==== Placekickers ====
- Steve Little, Arkansas (AP-1)

== Conference champion ==
The Arkansas Razorbacks, Texas Longhorns, and Texas A&M Aggies each shared the title.

- Arkansas represented the SWC in the 1976 Cotton Bowl Classic, defeating the Georgia Bulldogs, 31-10.

== Key ==
AP = Associated Press

== See also ==
- 1975 College Football All-America Team
