= Charles Miller (Canadian football) =

American gridiron football player (born 1953)

Profile
- Position: Defensive back

Personal information
- Born: August 2, 1953 (age 73); Fairmont, West Virginia, U.S.
- Listed height: 5 ft 11 in (1.80 m)
- Listed weight: 175 lb (79 kg)

Career information
- College: West Virginia
- NFL draft: 1975: 6th round, 150th overall pick

Career history
- 1975: Edmonton Eskimos

Awards and highlights
- Grey Cup champion (1975); Second-team All-East (1974)

Charles Miller (born August 2, 1953) is an American former professional football player who played for the Edmonton Eskimos of the Canadian Football League (CFL). He played college football at West Virginia University.
