= Dennis Swilley =

American football player (born 1955)

No. 67
- Position: Center

Personal information
- Born: June 28, 1955 (age 71); Bossier City, Louisiana, U.S.
- Listed height: 6 ft 3 in (1.91 m)
- Listed weight: 253 lb (115 kg)

Career information
- High school: Pine Bluff (AR)
- College: Texas A&M; North Texas
- NFL draft: 1977: 2nd round, 55th overall pick

Career history
- Minnesota Vikings (1977–1987)

Awards and highlights
- First-team All-SWC (1976)

Career NFL statistics
- Games played: 139
- Games started: 101
- Fumble recoveries: 3
- Stats at Pro Football Reference

Dennis Neal Swilley (born June 28, 1955) is an American former professional football player who was a center for the Minnesota Vikings of the National Football League (NFL) from 1977 to 1987. He retained the starting position regardless of the fact that the Vikings traded for future Hall of Famer Jim Langer from the Miami Dolphins. Swilley played college football for the Texas A&M Aggies and North Texas Mean Green.
