= Tom Donchez =

American football player (1952–2024)

No. 36
- Position: Running back

Personal information
- Born: March 10, 1952; Bethlehem, Pennsylvania, U.S.
- Died: August 28, 2024 (aged 72)
- Listed height: 6 ft 2 in (1.88 m)
- Listed weight: 216 lb (98 kg)

Career information
- High school: Bethlehem (PA) Liberty
- College: Penn State
- NFL draft: 1975: 4th round, 102nd overall pick

Career history
- Buffalo Bills (1975)*; Chicago Bears (1975)
- * Offseason or practice squad member only

Awards and highlights
- Second-team All-East (1974)
- Stats at Pro Football Reference

Tom Donchez (March 10, 1952 – August 28, 2024) was an American football running back. He was drafted in the fourth round with the 102nd overall pickby the Buffalo Bills in the 1975 NFL Draft. He was cut and picked up by the Chicago Bears, appearing in 14 games in 1975, mostly on special teams.

== Early life and career ==
Donchez was born in Bethlehem, Pennsylvania on March 10, 1952, to a single mother, Helen Donchez. He graduated from Liberty High School before going on to play college football at Penn State University where he met his wife Sheela.

Donchez played fullback for Penn State from 1970 to 1974 rushing for 1,422 career yards including 880 yards in 1974, when he had four 100-yard games. The highlight of his sports career was rushing for three touchdowns against Ohio University in 1974, with Penn State's 35-16 win being their 500th total win in school history.

After graduation he moved back to his hometown of Bethlehem and worked at Air Products for 35 years, while also earning an MBA from Lehigh University. Donchez helped found Penn State's Letterman's club, and served on the Bethlehem Catholic High School board of trustees.

== Personal life and death ==
Donchez was married to his wife Sheela for almost 50 years and had three sons, Andrew Peter and Micheal. Donchez also had two brothers, Dennis and Ron, and a sister Beverley. He died on August 28, 2024, at the age of 72.
