= Ed Simonini =

American football player (1954–2019)

- Simonini in 1977

No. 56, 54
- Position: Linebacker

Personal information
- Born: February 2, 1954; Portsmouth, Virginia, U.S.
- Died: September 30, 2019 (aged 65); Tulsa, Oklahoma, U.S.
- Listed height: 6 ft 0 in (1.83 m)
- Listed weight: 210 lb (95 kg)

Career information
- High school: Valley (Winchester, Nevada)
- College: Texas A&M
- NFL draft: 1976: 3rd round, 81st overall pick

Career history
- Baltimore Colts (1976–1981); New Orleans Saints (1982)

Awards and highlights
- Unanimous All-American (1975); Second-team All-American (1974); SWC Defensive Player of the Year (1973); 3× First-team All-SWC (1973, 1974, 1975); Second-team All-SWC (1972)

Career NFL statistics
- Games played: 83
- Starts: 57
- Interceptions: 3
- Interception yards: 4
- Stats at Pro Football Reference

Edward Clyde Simonini (February 2, 1954 – September 30, 2019) was an American professional football player who was a linebacker for seven seasons in the National Football League (NFL) with the Baltimore Colts and New Orleans Saints. He played college football for the Texas A&M Aggies

== College career ==
Simonini was born in Portsmouth, Virginia, the youngest of five children of Navy Commander Thomas Simonini (1921–2010) and his wife Patricia (1925–1997).

Simonini played college football at Texas A&M University under head coach Emory Bellard, and led the Aggies in tackles for three straight seasons. The team went 3–8 during Simonini's freshman year of 1972, but improved to 5–6 in 1973 and 8–3 in 1974. In 1975, Simonini had his best season, leading the team in tackles, and A&M finished 10–2, good enough for 11th in the AP poll. Simonini was also a finalist for the Lombardi Award his final season.

== Professional career ==
In the 1976 draft, the Baltimore Colts selected Simonini in the third round, 81st player selected overall. The 1977 season would be Simonini's first as a starter. He was credited with one interception and three fumble recoveries. The following season, with the NFL now at a 16-game schedule, Simonini started all 16 games.

Throughout his career, Simonini was considered too small to play linebacker in the NFL, even though one of the best linebackers in the NFL, Tom Jackson of the Denver Broncos, was at 5'11" an inch shorter than Simonini. Despite his ability, Simonini was in constant danger of losing his starter role to players bigger and taller. In 1979, Colts head coach Ted Marchibroda informed Simonini that he'd lost his starter role to rookie Barry Krauss. Krauss, a highly touted first-round draft pick, was overmatched, and Simonini quickly regained his starting job.

Simonini led the Colts in tackles from 1977 to 1980. In one of his most memorable games, Simonini made a key stop of New England Patriots quarterback Steve Grogan, sacking Grogan during a roll out, and then on the very next play knocking down a pass to seal the Colts' 31–26 win.

In 1981, Simonini broke his collarbone and missed the majority of the season after he tried to return too soon and re-broke the collarbone. In 1981, with the Colts dealing most of their key veteran players, and in a total rebuild mode with new head coach Frank Kush, Simonini requested his release and finished his career with the New Orleans Saints in 1982. He saw action in 9 games as a reserve during his final season.

The Saints traded Simonini to the Miami Dolphins ahead of the 1983 season but he opted to retire rather than relocate to play with the franchise.

== Death ==
Texas A&M announced that Simonini died of cancer on September 30, 2019. He was married to Karen Christy from December 30, 1978 until his death. Before his death, Simonini was elected to the SEC Football legends class of 2019 and was slated to be honored during a ceremony in December 2019.
