= Robert Jackson (linebacker) =

American football player (born 1954)

Robert L. Jackson
No. 56, 62
- Position: Linebacker

Personal information
- Born: August 7, 1954 (age 72); Houston, Texas, U.S.
- Listed height: 6 ft 1 in (1.85 m)
- Listed weight: 230 lb (104 kg)

Career information
- High school: Houston (TX) M. B. Smiley
- College: Texas A&M
- NFL draft: 1977: 1st round, 17th overall pick

Career history
- Cleveland Browns (1977–1981); Atlanta Falcons (1982)

Awards and highlights
- Unanimous All-American (1976); First-team All-SWC (1976); Second-team All-SWC (1975)

Career NFL statistics
- Sacks: 6
- Fumble recoveries: 2
- Interceptions: 2
- Stats at Pro Football Reference

Robert Lee Jackson (born August 7, 1954), nicknamed "Stonewall", is an American former professional football player who was a linebacker in the National Football League (NFL) . He played college football for the Texas A&M Aggies, then played in the NFL for the Cleveland Browns and the Atlanta Falcons between 1977 and 1982.

== Football career ==
Jackson attended Texas A&M University and was a consensus College Football All-America Team linebacker and a Lombardi Award finalist for the Aggies in 1976. He was a first-round selection of the Cleveland Browns in the 1977 NFL draft.

Jackson missed his entire rookie season after a preseason knee injury. He suffered another knee injury in the 1978 preseason, but he still appeared in 14 games that season. He was a regular starter for Cleveland in 1980 and 1981, starting 14 games in each season. In 1981, Cincinnati head coach Forrest Gregg referred to Jackson as the dirtiest player in the NFL.

In April 1982, Jackson was traded to the Denver Broncos, but he was waived before the regular season. He was signed by the Atlanta Falcons that September. Jackson's career concluded that year with five appearances for the Falcons.
