= Tim Gray =

American football player (1952–2015)

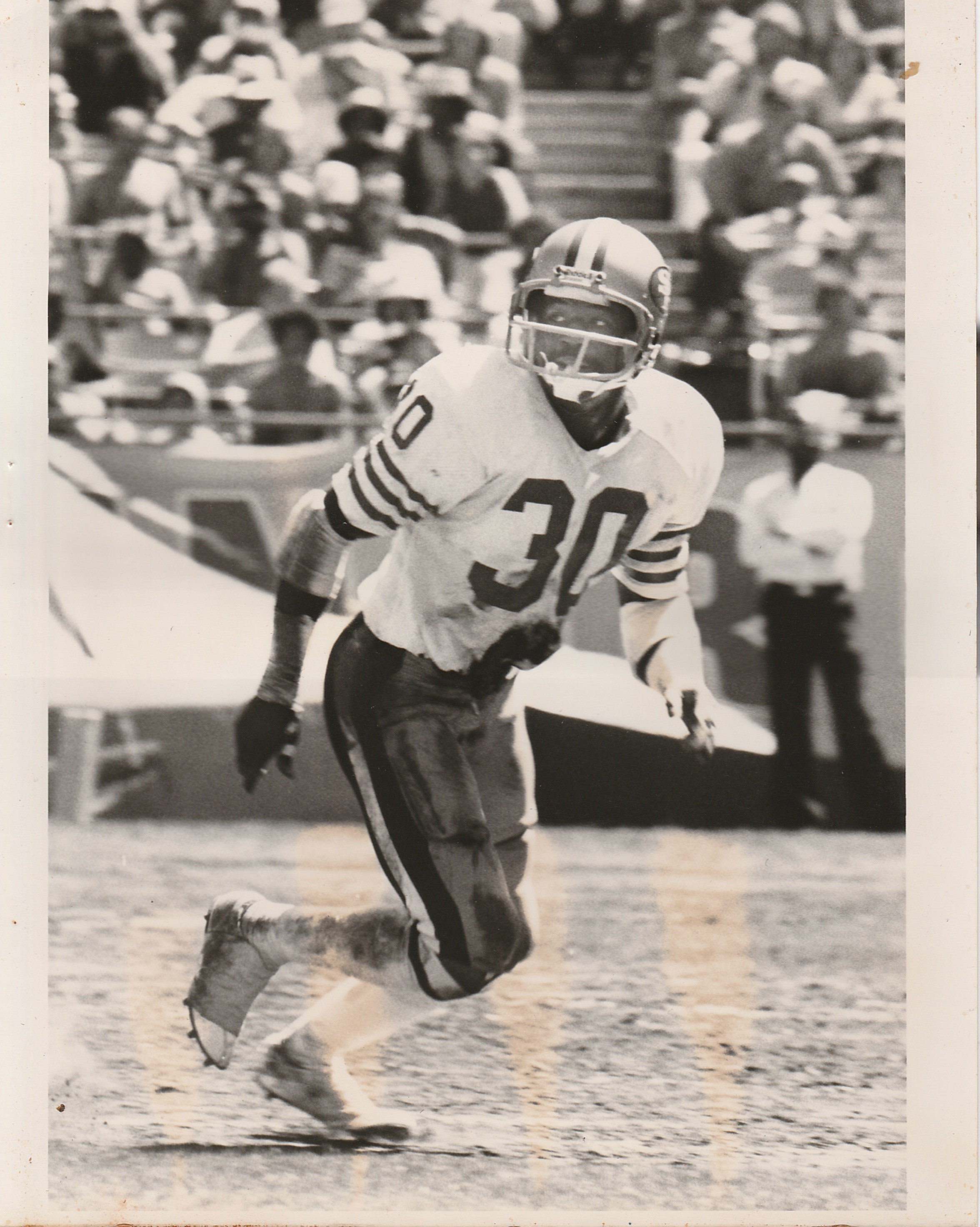

No. 33, 46, 30
- Position: Safety

Personal information
- Born: November 11, 1952; Houston, Texas, U.S.
- Died: October 8, 2015 (aged 62); Houston, Texas, U.S.
- Listed height: 6 ft 1 in (1.85 m)
- Listed weight: 200 lb (91 kg)

Career information
- High school: Kashmere (TX)
- College: Texas A&M
- NFL draft: 1975: 1st round, 21st overall pick

Career history
- St. Louis Cardinals (1975); Kansas City Chiefs (1976–1978); San Francisco 49ers (1979)

Awards and highlights
- Second-team All-American (1974); First-team All-SWC (1974); Second-team All-SWC (1973)

Career NFL statistics
- Interceptions: 13
- Fumble recoveries: 6
- Defensive touchdowns: 2
- Stats at Pro Football Reference

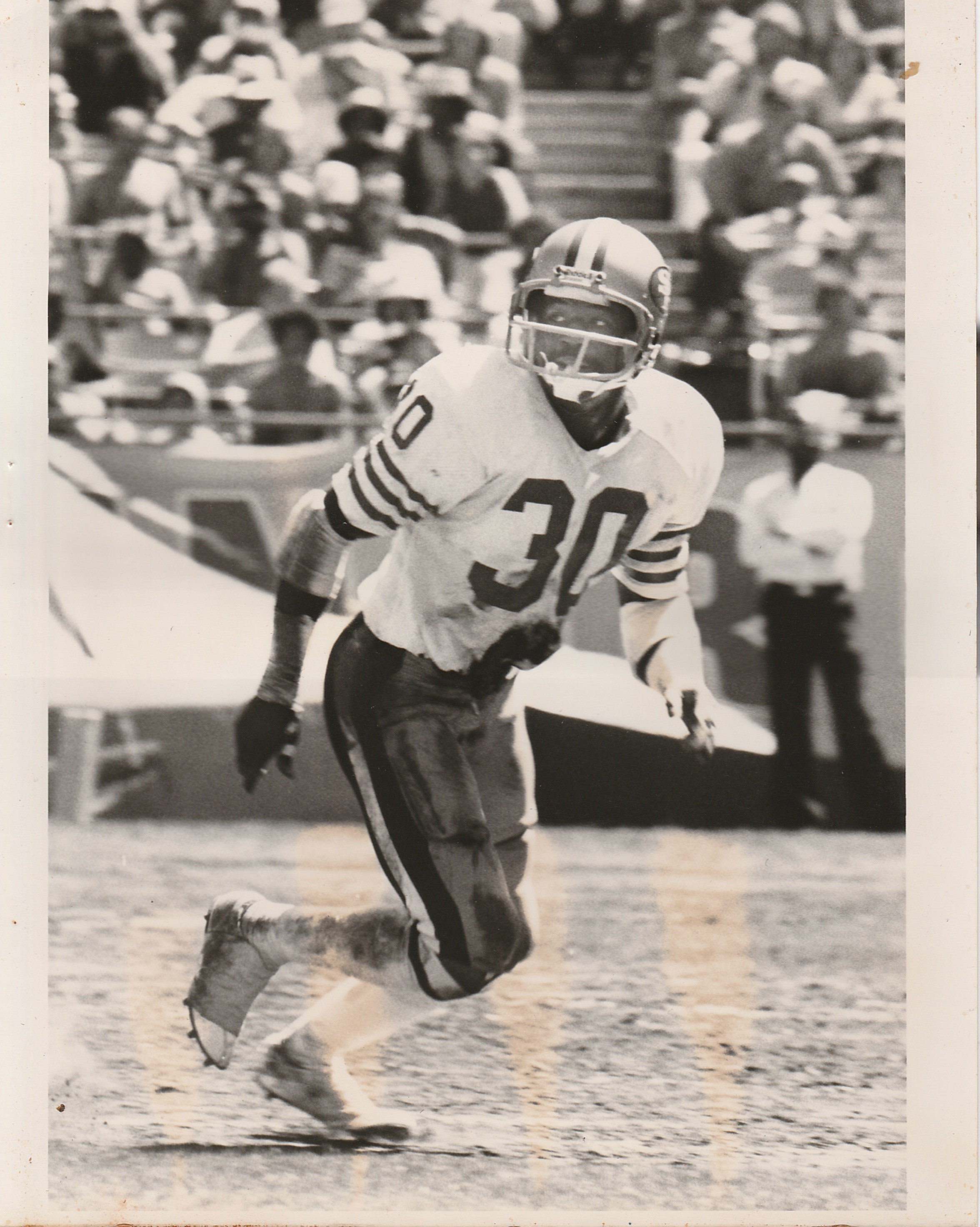
My dad with the 49ers.

Timothy Gray (November 11, 1952 – October 8, 2015) was an American professional football player who was a safety in the National Football League (NFL). He was selected in the first round by the St. Louis Cardinals with the 21st overall pick in the 1975 NFL draft. He played college football for the Texas A&M Aggies.

Gray also played for the Kansas City Chiefs and San Francisco 49ers. He died in 2015 at the age of 62.
