= R. C. Thielemann =

American football player (born 1955)

No. 68, 69
- Position: Guard

Personal information
- Born: August 12, 1955 (age 71); Houston, Texas, U.S.
- Listed height: 6 ft 4 in (1.93 m)
- Listed weight: 255 lb (116 kg)

Career information
- High school: Spring Woods (Houston)
- College: Arkansas
- NFL draft: 1977: 2nd round, 36th overall pick

Career history
- Atlanta Falcons (1977–1984); Washington Redskins (1985–1988)

Awards and highlights
- Super Bowl champion (XXII); First-team All-Pro (1982); 3× Pro Bowl (1981–1983); PFWA All-Rookie Team (1977); 2× First-team All-SWC (1975, 1976); Cotton Bowl champion (1976)

Career NFL statistics
- Games played: 157
- Games started: 148
- Stats at Pro Football Reference

Raymond Charles Thielemann (born August 12, 1955) is an American former professional football player who was a guard in the National Football League (NFL) for the Atlanta Falcons and the Washington Redskins.

Thielemann played college football for the Arkansas Razorbacks and was selected 36th overall in the second round of the 1977 NFL draft by the Falcons.

At the University of Arkansas, Thielemann helped the Razorbacks to a 10–2 record, win a share of the 1975 Southwest Conference championship, beat the Georgia Bulldogs in the 1976 Cotton Bowl Classic 31–10, and finish ranked No. 7 in the final AP poll. He also was on the Super Bowl XXII championship Washington Redskins team in 1987 as a member of the Redskins' famed "Hogs" offensive line.

In 1984, Thielemann played in five consecutive games wearing a cast on one hand to protect a broken thumb. Thielemann was traded to the Redskins for receiver Charlie Brown in 1985. Later that season he suffered a major knee injury in a game against the Chicago Bears in 1985, but was able to recover and continue playing football.
