= Billy Bryan =

American football player (born 1955)

No. 64, 72
- Position: Center

Personal information
- Born: June 21, 1955 (age 71); Burlington, North Carolina, U.S.
- Listed height: 6 ft 2 in (1.88 m)
- Listed weight: 251 lb (114 kg)

Career information
- High school: Williams (Burlington)
- College: Duke
- NFL draft: 1977: 4th round, 101st overall pick

Career history
- Denver Broncos (1977–1989)

Awards and highlights
- Second-team All-Pro (1985); First-team All-American (1976); 2× First-team All-ACC (1975, 1976)

Career NFL statistics
- Games played: 153
- Games started: 151
- Fumble recoveries: 6
- Stats at Pro Football Reference

William Kirby Bryan (born June 21, 1955) is an American former professional football player who was a center in the National Football League (NFL). He played college football for the Duke Blue Devils. He was selected by the Denver Broncos in the fourth round of the 1977 NFL draft out of Duke University. Bryan holds the second-longest NFL career for Duke graduates, behind only to Sonny Jurgensen. He went on to play for the Broncos from 1977 to 1988 and was All-Pro in 1985. In his career as a member of the Broncos, Bryan played 153 games.

== Honors and awards ==
- Duke Blue Devils football
  - 1976 All-America honors
  - Atlantic Coast Conference Jacobs Blocking Trophy
- Denver Broncos
  - Participated in 4 Super Bowls
  - All-Pro in 1985
  - 13 seasons in the National Football League
