= 1976 All-Atlantic Coast Conference football team =

ACC Football

The 1976 All-Atlantic Coast Conference football team consists of American football players chosen by the Associated Press (AP) as the best at each position in Atlantic Coast Conference ("ACC") during the 1976 NCAA Division I football season.

== All-Atlantic Coast Conference selections ==
=== Offensive selections ===
==== Split End ====
- Tom Hall, Duke (AP)

==== Tight End ====
- Steve Young, Wake Forest (AP)

==== Tackle ====
- Tom Schick, Maryland (AP)
- Mike Fagan, NC State (AP)

==== Guard ====
- Ed Fulton, Maryland (AP)
- Craig Funk, North Carolina (AP)

==== Center ====
- Billy Bryan, Duke (AP)

==== Quarterback ====
- Mark Manges, Maryland (AP)

==== Running Back ====
- Ted Brown, NC State (AP)
- Mike Voight, North Carolina (AP)
- James McDougald, Wake Forest (AP)

=== Defensive selections ===
==== Linemen ====
- Joe Campbell, Maryland (AP)
- Dee Hardison, North Carolina (AP)
- Bill Perdue, North Carolina (AP)
- Larry Seder, Maryland (AP)

==== Linebackers ====
- Brad Carr, Maryland (AP)
- Carl McGee, Duke (AP)
- Don Cervi, Wake Forest (AP)

==== Defensive backs ====
- Bill Armstrong, Wake Forest (AP)
- Ken Roy, Maryland (AP)
- Ronny Johnson, North Carolina (AP)
- Bob Grupp, Duke (AP)

=== Special teams ===
==== Kickers ====
- Vince Fusco, Duke (AP)

==== Return specialist ====
- Delbert Powell, North Carolina (AP)

== Key ==
AP = Associated Press

== See also ==
- 1976 College Football All-America Team
