= 1974 All-East football team =

American college football all-star team

The 1974 All-East football team consists of American football players chosen by various selectors as the best players at each position among the Eastern colleges and universities during the 1974 NCAA Division I football season.

== Offense ==
=== Quarterback ===
- Steve Joachim, Temple (AP-1; UPI-1)
- Mike Kruczek, Boston College (AP-2)

=== Running backs ===
- Keith Barnette, Boston College (AP-1; UPI-1)
- Tony Dorsett, Pittsburgh (AP-1; UPI-1)
- Walt Snickenberger, Princeton (AP-1)
- Artie Owens, West Virginia (AP-2; UPI-1)
- Tom Donchez, Penn State (AP-2)
- Henry Hynoski Sr., Temple (AP-2)

=== Tight end ===
- Dick Pawlewicz, William & Mary (AP-1)
- Dan Natale, Penn State (AP-2; UPI-1)

=== Wide receivers ===
- Pat McInally, Harvard (AP-1; UPI-1)
- Marshall Mills, West Virginia (AP-2)

=== Tackles ===
- Al Krevis, Boston College (AP-1; UPI-1)
- Charlie Palmer, Yale (AP-1)
- Dave Miers, Temple (AP-2)
- David Van Halanger, Temple (AP-2)

=== Guards ===
- Pat Staub, Temple (AP-1)
- Reynold Stoner, Pittsburgh (AP-1)
- Neil Begley, Army (AP-2; UPI-1)
- Tom Rafferty, Penn State (UPI-1)
- Ray Sweeney, Delaware (UPI-1)
- Jim Detmer, Colgate (AP-2)

=== Center ===
- Jack Baiorunos, Penn State (AP-1; UPI-1)
- Mike Carey, Pittsburgh (AP-2)

== Defense ==
=== Ends ===
- Greg Murphy, Penn State (AP-1; UPI-1)
- Nate Toran, Rutgers (AP-1)
- Rich Feryok, Yale (UPI-1)
- Brian Ameche, Yale (AP-2)
- Bill Taylor, Brown (AP-2)

=== Tackles ===
- Mike Hartenstine, Penn State (AP-1; UPI-1)
- Bob Shaw, Harvard (AP-1)
- Lou Kobza, Holy Cross (AP-2)
- Paul Krasnavage, Rutgers (AP-2)

=== Middle guard ===
- Gary Burley, Pittsburgh (AP-1; UPI-1)
- Joe Klecko, Temple (AP-2; UPI-1)

=== Linebackers ===
- Chet Moeller, Navy (AP-1; UPI-1)
- Alex MacLellan, Boston College (AP-1)
- Reggie Williams, Dartmouth (AP-1)
- Kelcy Daviston, Pittsburgh (AP-2; UPI-1)
- Ray Preston, Syracuse (AP-2; UPI-1)
- Greg Buttle, Penn State (UPI-1)
- Andy Bushak, Navy (AP-2)

=== Defensive backs ===
- John Provost, Holy Cross (AP-1; UPI-1)
- Elvin Charity, Yale (AP-1)
- Ed Jones, Rutgers (AP-1)
- Glenn Hodge, Pittsburgh (AP-2; UPI-1)
- Jim Bradley, Penn State (AP-2)
- Charles Miller, West Virginia (AP-2)

== Key ==
- AP = Associated Press
- UPI = United Press International

== See also ==
- 1974 College Football All-America Team
