= Bill Armstrong (defensive back) =

American gridiron football player (born 1955)

No. 19
- Position: Defensive back

Personal information
- Born: June 24, 1955 (age 71); Dover, New Jersey, U.S.
- Listed height: 6 ft 3 in (1.91 m)
- Listed weight: 205 lb (93 kg)

Career information
- High school: Randolph (Randolph, New Jersey)
- College: Wake Forest
- NFL draft: 1977: 8th round, 213th overall pick

Career history
- Cleveland Browns (1977)*; Hamilton Tiger-Cats (1977–1978)
- * Offseason or practice squad member only

Awards and highlights
- Unanimous All-American (1976); Second-team All-American (1975); 2× First-team All-ACC (1975, 1976); Wake Forest Demon Deacons Jersey No. 19 retired

Bill Armstrong (born June 24, 1955) is an American former professional football player who was a defensive back for two seasons with the Hamilton Tiger-Cats of the Canadian Football League (CFL). He played college football for the Wake Forest Demon Deacons and was selected by the Cleveland Browns of the National Football League (NFL) in the eighth round of the 1977 NFL draft.

== College career ==
Armstrong played for the Wake Forest Demon Deacons from 1973 to 1976. He was originally a quarterback before converting to defensive back his sophomore year. He was Wake Forest's first consensus football All-American in 1976. Armstrong also earned Associated Press Third-team All-American honors in 1975. He garnered First-team All-ACC recognition in 1975 and 1976. He was selected to the 1977 East–West Shrine Game. Armstrong set a school record for most career unassisted tackles with 271 while also recording 402 total tackles. He won the Arnold Palmer Award, which is given to Wake Forest's best male athlete, in 1976. He was inducted into the Wake Forest Sports Hall of Fame in 1996. Armstrong was named to the ACC 50th Anniversary team in 2002. He was also named an ACC Legend in 2005. His number 19 has been retired by the Wake Forest Demon Deacons.

== Professional career ==
Armstrong was selected by the Cleveland Browns of the NFL with the 213th pick in the 1977 NFL draft. He was released by the Browns on September 9, 1977. He played in five games for the Hamilton Tiger-Cats of the CFL from 1977 to 1978.
