= 1975 All-Atlantic Coast Conference football team =

1975 football team conference

The 1975 All-Atlantic Coast Conference football team consists of American football players chosen by the Associated Press (AP) as the best at each position in Atlantic Coast Conference ("ACC") during the 1975 NCAA Division I football season.

== All-Atlantic Coast Conference selections ==
=== Offensive selections ===
==== Split End ====
- Don Buckey, NC State (AP)

==== Tight End ====
- Bennie Cunningham, Clemson (AP)
- Pat Hovance, NC State (AP)

==== Tackle ====
- Gary Pellom, Duke (AP)
- Marion Koprowski, Maryland (AP)

==== Guard ====
- Tom Serfass, NC State (AP)
- Tom Glassic, Virginia (AP)

==== Center ====
- Billy Bryan, Duke (AP)

==== Quarterback ====
- Dave Buckey, NC State (AP)

==== Running Back ====
- Mike Voight, North Carolina (AP)
- Ted Brown, NC State (AP)
- Clark Gaines, Wake Forest (AP)

=== Defensive selections ===
==== Linemen ====
- Tom Higgins, NC State (AP)
- Paul DiVito, Maryland (AP)
- Dave Dusek, Duke (AP)
- Joe Campbell, Maryland (AP)

==== Linebackers ====
- Dave Meier, Duke (AP)
- Kevin Benson, Maryland (AP)
- Leroy Hughes, Maryland (AP)

==== Defensive backs ====
- Bill Armstrong, Wake Forest (AP)
- Jim Brechbiel, Maryland (AP)
- Ralph Stringer, NC State (AP)
- Bob Grupp, Duke (AP)

=== Special teams ===
==== Kickers ====
- Mike Socho, Maryland (AP)

==== Return specialist ====
- Troy Slade, Duke (AP)

== Key ==
AP = Associated Press

== See also ==
- 1975 College Football All-America Team
