= Edgar Fields =

American football player (born 1954)

No. 77, 63
- Position: Defensive tackle

Personal information
- Born: March 10, 1954 (age 72); Austin, Texas, U.S.
- Listed height: 6 ft 2 in (1.88 m)
- Listed weight: 225 lb (102 kg)

Career information
- High school: Albert Sidney Johnson (Austin)
- College: Texas A&M
- NFL draft: 1977: 3rd round, 63rd overall pick

Career history
- Atlanta Falcons (1977–1980); Detroit Lions (1981)\

Awards and highlights
- Second-team All-American (1975); 2× First-team All-SWC (1975, 1976)

Career NFL statistics
- Games played: 62
- Games started: 18
- Fumble recoveries: 1
- Stats at Pro Football Reference

Edgar Eugene Fields (born March 10, 1954) is an American former professional football player who was a defensive tackle in the National Football League (NFL). He went to Lyndon Johnson High School in Texas. He played college football for the Texas A&M Aggies before being selected 63rd overall in the third round of the 1977 NFL draft. He played five seasons in the NFL for the Atlanta Falcons and the Detroit Lions.
