= Chet Moeller =

American football player (born 1953)

Profile
- Position: Defensive back

Personal information
- Born: December 30, 1953 (age 72); Oakridge, Tennessee, U.S.

Career information
- College: Navy

Awards and highlights
- Unanimous All-American (1975); 2× First-team All-East (1974, 1975); Fairmont West High School (Kettering, Ohio) No. 16 retired
- College Football Hall of Fame

Chet Moeller (born December 30, 1953) is an American former football player who played for the Navy Midshipmen as a defensive back. In 2010, he was inducted into the College Football Hall of Fame. Moeller's jersey was retired by the Navy football in 2021.
