= Pat Thomas (defensive back) =

American football player and coach (born 1954)

No. 27
- Position: Cornerback

Personal information
- Born: September 1, 1954 (age 72); Plano, Texas, U.S.
- Listed height: 5 ft 9 in (1.75 m)
- Listed weight: 183 lb (83 kg)

Career information
- High school: Plano
- College: Texas A&M
- NFL draft: 1976: 2nd round, 39th overall pick

Career history

Playing
- Los Angeles Rams (1976–1982)

Coaching
- Houston Gamblers (1983) Defensive assistant; Houston (1985–1989) Defensive backs coach; Houston Oilers (1990–1992) Defensive backs coach; Indianapolis Colts (1993–2000) Defensive backs coach; Buffalo Bills (2001–2006) Defensive backs/cornerbacks coach

Awards and highlights
- First-team All-Pro (1980); 2× Second-team All-Pro (1978, 1980); 2× Pro Bowl (1978, 1980); 2× Consensus All-American (1974, 1975); 2× First-team All-SWC (1974, 1975)

Career NFL statistics
- Interceptions: 26
- Fumble recoveries: 7
- Defensive touchdowns: 1
- Stats at Pro Football Reference

Patrick Shane Thomas (born September 1, 1954) is an American former professional football player who was a cornerback for the Los Angeles Rams of the National Football League (NFL). He also played at running back and placekicker.

== Early life ==
Thomas was born in Plano, Texas. He attended Plano High School where he played on the 1971 state championship team.

== College career ==
Thomas attended Texas A&M University. He was an All-American player at Texas A&M University.

== Professional career ==
Thomas was drafted by the Los Angeles Rams in the 2nd round (39th overall) of the 1976 NFL Draft. He played in the NFL for the Los Angeles Rams from 1976 to 1982. He was twice named an All-Pro selection, in 1978 and 1980.

Thomas began his coaching career with the Houston Gamblers of the United States Football League in 1983. In 1985, Thomas became a coach for the University of Houston. He served in this position until 1989. He then moved to the National Football League to be a coach of the Houston Oilers until 1992. From 1993 to 2000, Thomas was the defensive backs coach of the Indianapolis Colts.

In 2001, Thomas was named as the defensive backs/conerbacks coach for the Buffalo Bills. As of 2006, he was no longer in that position.

== Personal life ==
Thomas started coaching at St. Joseph's Collegiate Institute in Buffalo New York in 2006. One student of specific note to Thomas was Naaman Roosevelt, who went on to break the record for most touchdown passes in a single season in western New York, and to play receiver at the University of Buffalo. He is the Father of Heather McCarthy, Patrick Thomas Jr., Tamara Thomas and Joshua Thomas.
