= Ted Smith (American football) =

American football player (1954–2025)

Profile
- Positions: Linebacker, guard

Personal information
- Born: February 11, 1954; Fremont, Ohio, U.S.
- Died: June 21, 2025 (aged 71); Gibsonburg, Ohio, U.S.
- Listed height: 6 ft 1 in (1.85 m)
- Listed weight: 242 lb (110 kg)

Career information
- High school: Gibsonburg (Gibsonburg, Ohio)
- College: Ohio State University

Career history
- 1972–1975: Ohio State

Awards and highlights
- Consensus All-American (1975); First-team All-Big Ten (1975)

Ted R. Smith (February 11, 1954 – June 21, 2025) was an American college football player who was a guard for the Ohio State Buckeyes. He was recognized as a consensus All-American in 1975.

== Early life ==
Smith graduated from Gibsonburg High School in Gibsonburg, Ohio. At Gibsonburg, he earned nine letters in various sports and was team captain of both the basketball and football teams. During his high school football career, he played both running back and linebacker positions. In his senior year he earned several honors including being named All-Ohio and High School All-American.

== College career ==
Smith played at Ohio State University under Buckeyes head coach Woody Hayes during the 1972, 1973, 1974 and 1975 seasons, lettering in the last three years. He played linebacker at first but switched to guard at the beginning of his junior year. Following his senior year, as a 6-foot-1-inch (185 cm), 242-pound (110 kg) guard, he was recognized as a consensus first-team All-American, having received first-team honors from several publications and organizations including the Football Writers Association of America and Associated Press.

== Personal life and death ==
Smith was married to Deborah Eckhardt and had four children. He spent 31 years in highway construction as a superintendent until he retired at age 55. He died on June 21, 2025, at the age of 71.
