= Tank Marshall =

American football player (born 1955)

No. 68
- Position: Defensive tackle

Personal information
- Born: January 6, 1955 (age 71); Dallas, Texas, U.S.
- Listed height: 6 ft 4 in (1.93 m)
- Listed weight: 245 lb (111 kg)

Career information
- High school: Franklin D. Roosevelt (Dallas)
- College: Texas A&M
- NFL draft: 1977: 3rd round, 72nd overall pick

Career history
- New York Jets (1977)

Awards and highlights
- First-team All-SWC (1975)
- Stats at Pro Football Reference

Charles Lee Marshall (born January 6, 1955) is an American former professional football defensive tackle. He played for the New York Jets in 1977.
