= Brian Duncan =

American football player (born 1952)

No. 35, 31
- Position: Running back

Personal information
- Born: March 31, 1952 (age 74); Olney, Texas, U.S.
- Listed height: 6 ft 0 in (1.83 m)
- Listed weight: 201 lb (91 kg)

Career information
- High school: Graham (Graham, Texas)
- College: SMU
- NFL draft: 1976: undrafted

Career history
- Jacksonville Express (1975); Cleveland Browns (1976–1977); Houston Oilers (1978)
- Stats at Pro Football Reference

James Brian Duncan (born March 31, 1952) is an American former professional football player who was a running back for the Cleveland Browns and Houston Oilers of the National Football League (NFL). He played college football for the SMU Mustangs.
