= Henry Hynoski Sr. =

American football player (born 1953)

Henry Hynoski
No. 36
- Position: Running back

Personal information
- Born: May 30, 1953 (age 73); Mount Carmel, Pennsylvania, U.S.
- Listed height: 6 ft 0 in (1.83 m)
- Listed weight: 210 lb (95 kg)

Career information
- High school: Mount Carmel
- College: Temple (1971–1974)
- NFL draft: 1975: 6th round, 154th overall pick

Career history
- Cleveland Browns (1975–1976); Philadelphia Eagles (1977)*; Winnipeg Blue Bombers (1978)*
- * Offseason or practice squad member only

Awards and highlights
- Second-team All-East (1974)

Career NFL statistics
- Rushing attempts: 7
- Rushing yards: 38
- Receptions: 4
- Receiving yards: 31
- Stats at Pro Football Reference

Henry Philip Hynoski Sr. (born May 30, 1953) is an American former professional football player who was a running back for one season with the Cleveland Browns of the National Football League (NFL). He was selected by the Browns in the sixth round of the 1975 NFL draft after playing college football for the Temple Owls.

== Early life and college ==
Henry Philip Hynoski Sr. was born on May 30, 1953, in Mount Carmel, Pennsylvania. He attended Mount Carmel High School in Mount Carmel.

Hynoski was a member of the Temple Owls of Temple University from 1971 to 1974 and a three-year letterman from 1972 to 1974. He rushed 77 times for 331 yards and two touchdowns in 1972 while also catching two passes for 19 yards. In 1973, he recorded 156 carries for 881 yards and seven touchdowns, and seven receptions for 120 yards and three touchdowns. As a senior in 1974, Hynoski rushed 206 times for 1,006 yards and seven touchdowns while catching 24 passes for 274 yards and two touchdowns. He was named second-team All-East by the Associated Press for the 1974 season. His 2,218 career rushing yards were the most in school history at the time. Hynoski was inducted into the Pennsylvania Sports Hall of Fame in 1989 and the Temple University Athletics Hall of Fame in 1994.

== Professional career ==
Hynoski was selected by the Cleveland Browns in the sixth round, with the 154th overall pick, of the 1975 NFL draft. He played in all 14 games for the Browns in 1975, totaling seven rushing attempts for 38 yards. four receptions for 31 yards, eight kick returns for 194 yards, and two punt returns for 16 yards. He did not play any during the 1976 season and was released by the Browns in 1977.

Hynoski signed with the Philadelphia Eagles in 1977. He was released on August 30, 1977.

Hynoski signed with the Winnipeg Blue Bombers of the Canadian Football League in 1978 but was later released without appearing in a game.

== Personal life ==
Hynoski's son Henry Hynoski also played in the NFL.
