= Bill Craven =

American football player (born 1951)

No. 23
- Position: Defensive back

Personal information
- Born: December 18, 1951 (age 74); Ranson, West Virginia, U.S.
- Listed height: 5 ft 11 in (1.80 m)
- Listed weight: 190 lb (86 kg)

Career information
- High school: Frederick
- College: Harvard
- NFL draft: 1973: undrafted

Career history
- Florida Blazers (1974)*; Philadelphia Bell (1974-1975); Cleveland Browns (1976–1977)
- * Offseason or practice squad member only
- Stats at Pro Football Reference

William Moten Craven (born December 16, 1951) is an American former professional football player who was a defensive back for the Cleveland Browns of National Football League (NFL). He played college football for the Harvard University.
