= Henry Sheppard =

American football player (born 1952)

No. 65
- Positions: Guard, tackle

Personal information
- Born: November 12, 1952 (age 73); Cuero, Texas, U.S.
- Listed height: 6 ft 6 in (1.98 m)
- Listed weight: 255 lb (116 kg)

Career information
- High school: Cuero
- College: SMU
- NFL draft: 1976: 5th round, 130th overall pick

Career history
- Cleveland Browns (1976–1981)

Awards and highlights
- 2× First-team All-SWC (1974, 1975)

Career NFL statistics
- Games played: 82
- Games started: 61
- Fumble recoveries: 3
- Stats at Pro Football Reference

Henry Sheppard (born November 12, 1952) is an American former professional football player who was an offensive lineman in the National Football League (NFL). He was selected by the Cleveland Browns in the fifth round of the 1976 NFL draft. He played college football for the SMU Mustangs.
