= Gibsonburg High School =

Location
- 740 South Main Street; Gibsonburg, Ohio 43431
- 41.37602°N 83.321968°W

Information
- Type: Public
- Principal: Justin Johnson
- Grades: 9-12
- Enrollment: 220 (2024-2025)
- Colors: Orange and Black
- Athletics conference: Sandusky Bay Conference
- Mascot: Golden Bear
- Website: www.gibsonburgschools.org/gibsonburg-hs

Gibsonburg High School is a public high school in Gibsonburg, Ohio. It is the only high school in the Gibsonburg Exempted Village School District. Its nickname is the Golden Bears.

== Ohio High School Athletic Association State Championships ==
- Boys Baseball – 2005
- Girls Softball – 2001, 2002, 2003

== Notable alumni ==
- Nina McClelland – Dean Emeritus and former professor of chemistry at the University of Toledo
- Larry Arndt - professional baseball player
- Tony Kern - film director, screenwriter, motion picture artist and film producer
- Ted Smith - All-American football player 1975 at The Ohio State University
