= 1975 All-America college football team =

Official list of the best college football players of 1975

The 1975 All-America college football team is composed of college football players who were selected as All-Americans by various organizations and writers that chose College Football All-America Teams in 1975. The National Collegiate Athletic Association (NCAA) recognizes four selectors as "official" for the 1975 season. They are: (1) the American Football Coaches Association (AFCA); (2) the Associated Press (AP) selected based on the votes of sports writers at AP newspapers; (3) the Football Writers Association of America (FWAA) selected by the nation's football writers; and (4) the United Press International (UPI) selected based on the votes of sports writers at UPI newspapers. Other selectors included Football News (FN), the Newspaper Enterprise Association (NEA), The Sporting News (TSN), Time magazine, and the Walter Camp Football Foundation (WC).

Three players were unanimously selected by all four official selectors and all five unofficial selectors. They were running back Archie Griffin of Ohio State, defensive linemen Steve Niehaus of Notre Dame and Lee Roy Selmon of Oklahoma.

The 1975 Oklahoma Sooners football team had seven players who received first-team honors. The Oklahoma honorees were Lee Roy Selmon, receiver Tinker Owens, offensive tackle Mike Vaughan, offensive guard Terry Webb, defensive end Jimbo Elrod, middle guard Dewey Selmon, and return specialist Joe Washington. Ohio State followed with five first-team honorees: offensive guard Ted Smith, quarterback Cornelius Greene, running back and Heisman Trophy winner Archie Griffin, defensive back Tim Fox, and punter Tom Skladany.

== Consensus All-Americans ==
The following chart identifies the NCAA-recognized consensus All-Americans for the year 1975 and displays which first-team designations they received.

Name	Position	School	Number	Official	Other
Archie Griffin	Running back	Ohio State	4/5/9	AFCA, FWAA, AP, UPI	FN, NEA, TSN, Time, WC
Steve Niehaus	Defensive tackle	Notre Dame	4/5/9	AFCA, AP, FWAA, UPI	FN, NEA, TSN, Time, WC
Lee Roy Selmon	Defensive tackle	Oklahoma	4/5/9	AFCA, AP, FWAA, UPI	FN, NEA, TSN, Time, WC
Greg Buttle	Linebacker	Penn State	3/5/8	AP, FWAA, UPI	FN, NEA, Time, TSN, WC
Chuck Muncie	Running back	California	3/5/8	AP, FWAA, UPI	FN, NEA, TSN, Time, WC
Ed Simonini	Linebacker	Texas A&M	4/3/7	AFCA, AP, FWAA, UPI	FN, TSN, WC
Tim Fox	Defensive back	Ohio State	3/4/7	AFCA, FWAA, UPI	NEA, TSN, Time, WC
Ricky Bell	Running back	USC	4/2/6	AFCA, AP, FWAA, UPI	FN, WC
Leroy Cook	Defensive end	Alabama	4/2/6	AFCA, AP, FWAA, UPI	FN, WC
Rik Bonness	Center	Nebraska	4/2/6	AFCA, AP, FWAA, UPI	FN, WC
Chet Moeller	Defensive back	Navy	4/2/6	AFCA, AP, FWAA, UPI	FN, WC
Bob Simmons	Offensive tackle	Texas	3/3/6	AFCA, AP, UPI	FN, NEA, WC
Pat Thomas	Defensive back	Texas A&M	3/3/6	AFCA, AP, UPI	FN, NEA, WC
Dennis Lick	Offensive tackle	Wisconsin	2/4/6	AFCA, UPI	NEA, TSN, Time, WC
Steve Rivera	Wide receiver	California	3/2/5	AFCA, AP, UPI	FN, WC
John Sciarra	Quarterback	UCLA	3/2/5	AFCA, AP, UPI	NEA, WC
Dewey Selmon	Middle guard	Oklahoma	3/2/5	AFCA, AP, UPI	FN, WC
Randy Johnson	Offensive guard	Georgia	3/1/4	AFCA, AP, UPI	WC
Ted Smith	Offensive guard	Ohio State	2/2/4	AP, FWAA	FN, NEA
Jimbo Elrod	Defensive end	Oklahoma	2/1/3	AP, UPI	WC
Sammy Green	Linebacker	Florida	2/1/3	AP, FWAA	NEA
Larry Seivers	Wide receiver	Tennessee	1/1/2	AP	FN

== Offense ==
=== Receivers ===
- Steve Rivera, California (AFCA, AP-3, UPI-1, FN, NEA-2, WC)
- Larry Seivers, Tennessee (AP-1, FN)
- Henry Marshall, Missouri (AFCA, NEA-1)
- Theo Bell, Arizona (UPI-2, NEA-1)
- Don Buckey, N.C. State (FWAA)
- Larry Dorsey, Tennessee State (TSN, Time)
- Dave Logan, Colorado (TSN)
- Tinker Owens, Oklahoma (Time)
- Steve Largent, Tulsa (AP-2)
- Tony Hill, Stanford (NEA-2)

=== Tight ends ===
- Bennie Cunningham, Clemson (TSN, Time, WC)
- Mike Barber, Louisiana Tech (AP-1, NEA-1)
- Ken MacAfee, Notre Dame (AP-3, UPI-1, NEA-2)
- Barry Burton, Vanderbilt (AP-2)
- Don Hasselbeck, Colorado (UPI-2)

=== Tackles ===
- Bob Simmons, Texas (AFCA, AP-1, UPI-1, FN, NEA-1, WC)
- Dennis Lick, Wisconsin (AFCA [g], UPI-1, NEA-1, TSN, Time, WC)
- Rod Walters, Iowa (AP-3, NEA-1 [g], TSN, Time)
- Mark Koncar, Colorado (AP-1)
- Marvin Powell, USC (AFCA, AP-2, UPI-2, NEA-2)
- Mike Vaughan, Oklahoma (UPI-2, FN)
- Brad Oates, BYU (AP-2)
- Lamar Parrish, Georgia (NEA-2)
- Dan Jiggetts, Harvard (AP-3)

=== Guards ===
- Randy Johnson, Georgia (AFCA, AP-1, UPI-1, WC)
- Ted Smith, Ohio State (AP-1, FWAA, FN, NEA-1)
- Ken Jones, Arkansas State (AP-3, FWAA, TSN, Time)
- Joe Devlin, Iowa (TSN, Time)
- Terry Webb, Oklahoma (UPI-1, WC)
- Tom Rafferty, Penn State (AP-2, FWAA, UPI-2, FN)
- Randy Cross, UCLA (AP-2, FWAA, NEA-2)
- Mickey Marvin, Tennessee (UPI-2)
- Ken Long, Purdue (NEA-2)
- Carl Dean, New Mexico State (AP-3)

=== Centers ===
- Rik Bonness, Nebraska (AFCA, AP-1, FWAA, UPI-1, FN, WC)
- Pete Brock, Colorado (UPI-2, NEA-1, Time, TSN)
- James Files, McNeese State (AP-2)
- Ray Pinney, Washington (NEA-2)
- Leo Tierney, Georgia Tech (AP-3)

=== Quarterbacks ===
- John Sciarra, UCLA (AFCA, AP-1, UPI-2, NEA-1, WC)
- Craig Penrose, San Diego State (TSN, Time)
- Marty Akins, Texas (AFCA, FWAA, NEA-2)
- Gene Swick, Toledo (AP-3, UPI-1)
- Cornelius Greene, Ohio State (FN)
- Jeff Grantz, South Carolina (AP-2)

=== Running backs ===
- Archie Griffin, Ohio State (AFCA, AP-1, FWAA, UPI-1, FN, NEA-1, TSN, Time, WC)
- Ricky Bell, USC (AFCA, AP-1, FWAA, UPI-1, FN, NEA-2, WC)
- Chuck Muncie, California (AP-1, FWAA, UPI-1, FN, NEA-1, TSN, Time, WC)
- Tony Dorsett, Pittsburgh (AFCA, AP-2, FWAA, UPI-2, NEA-2, WC)
- Earl Campbell, Texas (AFCA, AP-3)
- Jimmy DuBose, Florida (AP-2, UPI-2)
- Joe Washington, Oklahoma (AP-2, UPI-2, NEA-2)
- Gordon Bell, Michigan (AP-3)
- Louie Giammona, Utah State (AP-3)

== Defense ==
=== Defensive ends ===
- Leroy Cook, Alabama (AFCA, AP-1, FWAA, UPI-1, FN, NEA-2, WC)
- Jimbo Elrod, Oklahoma (AP-1, UPI-1, WC)
- Troy Archer, Colorado (Time)
- Bob Martin, Nebraska (AP-2, UPI-2, FN)
- Jimmy Lisko, Arkansas State (AP-2)
- Duncan McColl, Stanford (UPI-2)
- Kim Bokamper, San Jose State (NEA-2)
- Randy Cozens, Pittsburgh (AP-3)
- Nate Toran, Rutgers (AP-3)

=== Defensive tackles ===
- Leroy Selmon, Oklahoma (AFCA, AP-1, FWAA, UPI-1, FN, NEA-1, TSN [DE], Time [DE], WC)
- Steve Niehaus, Notre Dame (AFCA, AP-1, FWAA, UPI-1, FN [DE], NEA-1, TSN, Time, WC)
- Ken Novak, Purdue (FWAA, TSN, Time)
- James White, Oklahoma State (TSN [DE])
- Mike Dawson, Arizona (AP-2)
- Edgar Fields, Texas A&M (AP-2)
- Gary Jeter, USC (UPI-2)
- Nick Buonamici, Ohio State (UPI-2)
- Bob Baumhower, Alabama (AP-3)

=== Middle guards ===
- Dewey Selmon, Oklahoma (AFCA, AP-1, UPI-1, FN, WC)
- Cliff Frazier, UCLA (NEA-1)
- Tim Davis, Michigan (AP-2, UPI-2)
- Tom Higgins, NC State (AP-3, NEA-2)

=== Linebackers ===
- Ed Simonini, Texas A&M (AFCA, AP-1, FWAA, UPI-1, FN, NEA-2, TSN, WC)
- Greg Buttle, Penn State (AP-1, FWAA, UPI-1, FN, NEA-1, Time, TSN, WC)
- Sammy Green, Florida (AP-1, FWAA, NEA-1)
- Kevin McLain, Colorado State (UPI-2, NEA-1, TSN, Time)
- Woody Lowe, Alabama (UPI-1)
- Larry Gordon, Arizona State (NEA-2, Time)
- Ray Preston, Syracuse (AFCA, AP-3, UPI-2)
- Reggie Williams, Dartmouth (AFCA, AP-2, NEA-2)
- Garth TenNapel, Texas A&M (AP-2, NEA-1)
- Brian Ruff, The Citadel (AP-2)
- Phil Heck, California (UPI-2)
- Calvin O'Neal, Michigan (NEA-2)
- Gary Spani, Kansas State (AP-3)
- Donnie Thomas, Indiana (AP-3)

=== Defensive backs ===
- Tim Fox, Ohio State (AFCA, AP-3, FWAA, UPI-1, NEA-1, TSN, Time, WC)
- Pat Thomas, Texas A&M (AFCA, AP-1, UPI-1, FN, NEA-1, WC)
- Chet Moeller, Navy (AFCA, AP-1, FWAA, UPI-1, FN, NEA-2, WC)
- Mike Haynes, Arizona State (AFCA, AP-1, UPI-2, FN, NEA-1, TSN, Time)
- Don Dufek, Michigan (AFCA, FWAA, UPI-2, FN, WC)
- James Hunter, Grambling (NEA-1, TSN, Time)
- Kurt Knoff, Kansas (AP-3, NEA-2, TSN, Time)
- Wonder Monds, Nebraska (FWAA)
- Jim Bolding, East Carolina (AP-2)
- Lester Hayes, Texas A&M (AP-2)
- Shafer Suggs, Ball State (AP-2)
- Danny Reece, USC (UPI-2)
- Bill Armstrong, Wake Forest (AP-3, NEA-2)
- Tommy Marvaso, Cincinnati (NEA-2)

== Special teams ==
=== Kickers ===
- Chris Bahr, Penn State (UPI-1, TSN, Time, WC)
- Bob Berg, New Mexico (FWAA)
- Dave Lawson, Air Force (UPI-2, FN)

=== Punters ===
- Tom Skladany, Ohio State (FWAA, FN)
- Rick Engles, Tulsa (TSN, Time)

=== Returner ===
- Joe Washington, Oklahoma (FWAA)

== Key ==
- **Bold** – Consensus All-American
- -1 – First-team selection
- -2 – Second-team selection
- -3 – Third-team selection

=== Official selectors ===
- AFCA – American Football Coaches Association
- AP – Associated Press
- FWAA – Football Writers Association of America
- UPI – United Press International

=== Other selectors ===
- FN – Football News
- NEA – Newspaper Enterprise Association
- TSN – The Sporting News
- Time – Time magazine
- WC – Walter Camp Football Foundation

== See also ==
- 1975 All-Atlantic Coast Conference football team
- 1975 All-Big Eight Conference football team
- 1975 All-Big Ten Conference football team
- 1975 All-Pacific-8 Conference football team
- 1975 All-SEC football team
- 1975 All-Southwest Conference football team
