= Oscar Roan =

American football player (born 1951)

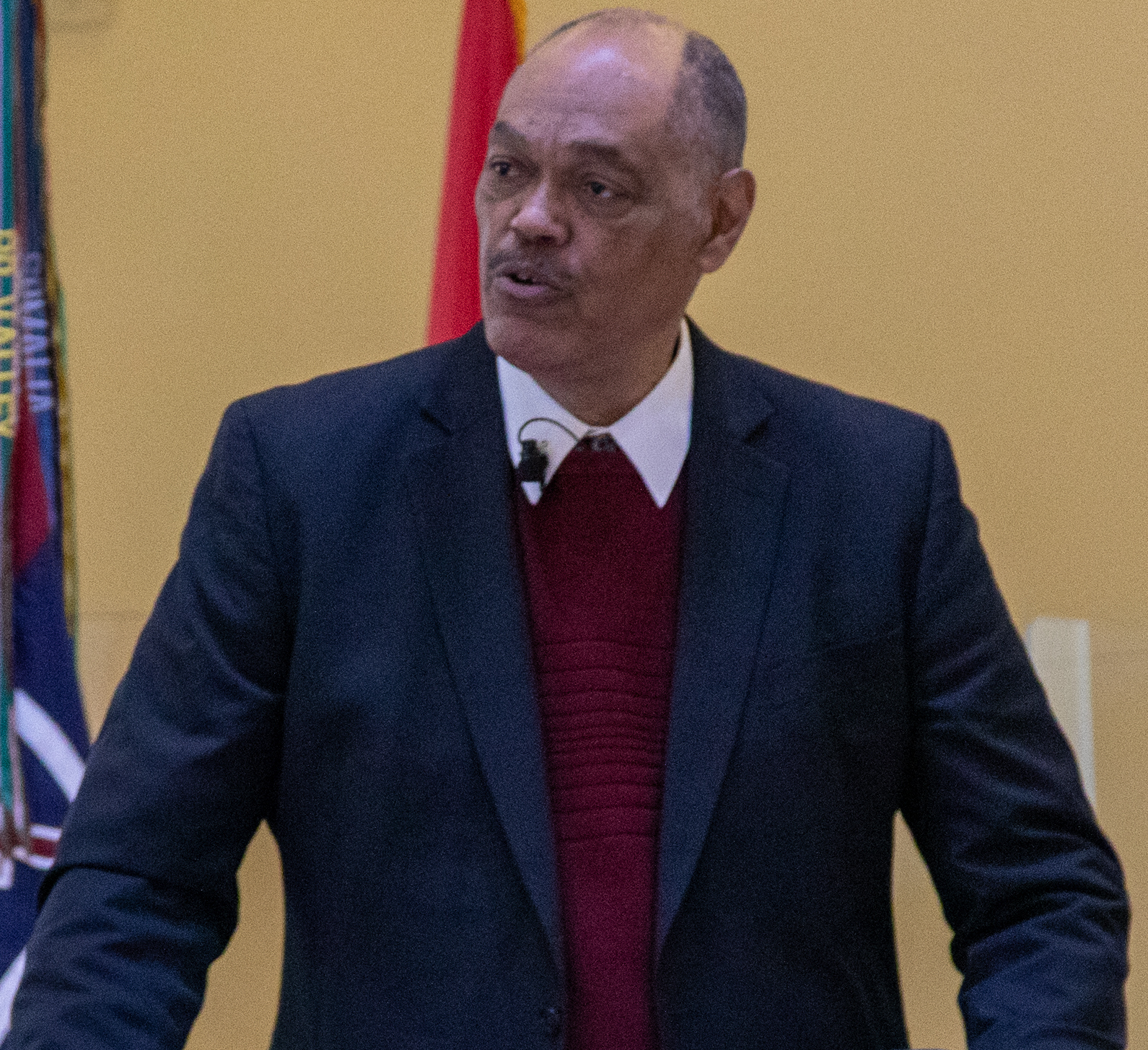
- Roan at Fort Drum in 2023

No. 81
- Position: Tight end

Personal information
- Born: October 27, 1951 (age 75); Dallas, Texas, U.S.
- Listed height: 6 ft 6 in (1.98 m)
- Listed weight: 215 lb (98 kg)

Career information
- High school: South Oak Cliff (Dallas)
- College: SMU / UCLA
- NFL draft: 1975: 3rd round, 57th overall pick

Career history
- Cleveland Browns (1975–1978)

Awards and highlights
- First-team All-SWC (1974); Second-team All-SWC (1973)

Career NFL statistics
- Receptions: 69
- Receiving yards: 773
- Touchdowns: 9
- Stats at Pro Football Reference

Oscar Bennie Roan III (born October 17, 1951) is an American former professional football player who was a tight end in the National Football League (NFL). He was selected by the Cleveland Browns in the third round of the 1975 NFL draft. He played college football for the SMU Mustangs and UCLA Bruins.

Outside of football, Roan also played college basketball for SMU.
