= 1980 Chicago Bears season =

NFL team season

- Owner: George Halas
- General manager: Jim Finks
- Head coach: Neill Armstrong
- Home stadium: Soldier Field

Results
- Record: 7–9
- Division place: 3rd NFC Central
- Playoffs: Did not qualify

The 1980 season was the Chicago Bears' 61st in the National Football League, and their third under head coach Neill Armstrong. The team failed to improve from their 10–6 record from 1979 to finish at 7–9, and failed to make the playoffs for the first time since 1978.

One of the victories was on Thanksgiving at Detroit; Chicago entered the Thursday game at 4–8, last place in the NFC Central division, and were trailing 17–3 after three quarters. With no time left in regulation, Bears quarterback Vince Evans scored a game-tying touchdown that sent the game into overtime. Then, before a national television audience on CBS, Dave Williams returned a kickoff 95 yards for a touchdown on the first play of overtime for a 23–17 victory over the stunned Lions.

Running back Walter Payton once again led the NFC in rushing for the fifth straight year with 1,460 yards; he also had the league's highest annual salary at $475,000.

== Offseason ==
=== Draft ===
1980 Chicago Bears draft
Round	Pick	Player	Position	College	Notes
1	19	Otis Wilson *	Linebacker	Louisville	
2	46	Matt Suhey	Running back	Penn State	
4	103	Arland Thompson	Guard	Baylor	
5	130	Paul Tabor	Center	Oklahoma	
6	156	Mike Guess	Defensive back	Ohio State	
7	183	Emanuel Tolbert	Wide receiver	SMU	
8	215	Randy Clark	Center	Northern Illinois	
9	242	Turk Schonert	Quarterback	Stanford	
10	269	Willie Stephens	Defensive back	Texas Tech	
11	296	Chris Judge	Defensive back	TCU	
12	323	Bob Fisher	Tight end	SMU	
Made roster * Made at least one Pro Bowl during career

=== Undrafted free agents ===
1980 undrafted free agents of note
Player	Position	College
Vincent Allen	Running Back	Indiana State
Rennie Buckner	Tackle	Boise State
Mike Harris	Wide receiver	Purdue
Larry Jamieson	Linebacker	Jackson State
Chuck Mate	Kicker	Notre Dame
Rick Nash	Wide Receiver	Idaho State
Mike Wright	Quarterback	Bowling Green

== Roster ==
1980 Chicago Bears roster
Quarterbacks (QB): 7 Bob Avellini; 8 Vince Evans; 15 Mike Phipps; Running backs (RB): 35 Roland Harper; 37 Willie McClendon; 34 Walter Payton; 30 John Skibinski; 26 Matt Suhey; 22 Dave Williams; Wide receivers (WR): 84 Brian Baschnagel; 83 Kris Haines; 89 James Scott; 80 Rickey Watts; Tight ends (TE): 81 Robin Earl; 85 Bob Fisher; 88 Greg Latta	Offensive linemen (OL): 64 Ted Albrecht T; 65 Noah Jackson G; 62 Dan Jiggetts T; 70 Dennis Lick T; 71 Rocco Moore G; 52 Dan Neal C; 69 Revie Sorey G; 53 Paul Tabor G; Defensive linemen (DL): 99 Dan Hampton DE; 90 Al Harris DE; 73 Mike Hartenstine DE; 68 Jim Osborne DT; 82 Alan Page DT; 76 Ron Rydalch DT	Linebackers (LB): 59 Gary Campbell OLB; 51 Bruce Herron OLB; 54 Tom Hicks MLB; 57 Lee Kunz MLB; 55 Otis Wilson OLB; Defensive backs (DB): 49 Dave Becker SS; 48 Allan Ellis CB; 45 Gary Fencik SS; 36 Wentford Gaines CB; 47 Jon Hoke CB; 46 Doug Plank FS; 44 Terry Schmidt CB; 23 Len Walterscheid FS; Special teams (ST): 86 Bob Parsons P; 16 Bob Thomas K	Reserve: 87 Mike Cobb TE (IR); 24 Virgil Livers CB (IR); 29 Vaughn Lusby CB (IR); 58 Jerry Muckensturm LB (IR); 72 Brad Shearer DT (IR); Rookies in italics

== Schedule ==
Week	Date	Opponent	Result	Record	Venue	Attendance
1	September 7	at **Green Bay Packers**	**L** 6–12 (OT)	0–1	Lambeau Field	54,381
2	September 14	New Orleans Saints	**W** 22–3	1–1	Soldier Field	62,523
3	September 21	**Minnesota Vikings**	**L** 14–34	1–2	Soldier Field	59,983
4	September 28	at Pittsburgh Steelers	**L** 3–38	1–3	Three Rivers Stadium	53,987
5	October 6	**Tampa Bay Buccaneers**	**W** 23–0	2–3	Soldier Field	61,350
6	October 12	at **Minnesota Vikings**	**L** 7–13	2–4	Metropolitan Stadium	46,751
7	October 19	**Detroit Lions**	**W** 24–7	3–4	Soldier Field	58,508
8	October 26	at Philadelphia Eagles	**L** 14–17	3–5	Veterans Stadium	68,752
9	November 3	at Cleveland Browns	**L** 21–27	3–6	Cleveland Municipal Stadium	84,225
10	November 9	Washington Redskins	**W** 35–21	4–6	Soldier Field	57,159
11	November 16	Houston Oilers	**L** 6–10	4–7	Soldier Field	59,390
12	November 23	at Atlanta Falcons	**L** 17–28	4–8	Atlanta–Fulton County Stadium	49,156
13	November 27	at **Detroit Lions**	**W** 23–17 (OT)	5–8	Pontiac Silverdome	75,397
14	December 7	**Green Bay Packers**	**W** 61–7	6–8	Soldier Field	57,176
15	December 14	Cincinnati Bengals	**L** 14–17 (OT)	6–9	Soldier Field	48,808
16	December 20	at **Tampa Bay Buccaneers**	**W** 14–13	7–9	Tampa Stadium	55,298
Note: Intra-division opponents are in **bold** text.

== Season summary ==
=== Week 1: at Green Bay Packers ===
Week 1: Chicago Bears at Green Bay Packers

Quarter	1	2	3	4	OT	Total
Bears	3	0	3	0	0	6
Packers	0	6	0	0	6	12

at Lambeau Field, Green Bay, Wisconsin

- Date: September 7, 1980
- Game time: 1:00 p.m. CST
- Game weather: Overcast, 65 °F (18 °C)
- Referee: Jim Tunney
- TV announcers (CBS): Lindsey Nelson and Sonny Jurgensen

Game information

First quarter

Second quarter

Third quarter

Fourth quarter

Top passers

- CHI – Mike Phipps – 17/30, 174 yards, 3 INT
- GB – Lynn Dickey – 10/22, 138 yards, 1 INT

Top rushers

- CHI – Walter Payton – 31 rushes, 65 yards
- GB – Eddie Lee Ivery – 15 rushes, 73 yards

Top receivers

- CHI – James Scott – 5 receptions, 59 yards
- GB – James Lofton – 5 receptions, 77 yards

=== Week 2 ===
Team	1	2	3	4	Total
Saints	3	0	0	0	3
• Bears	10	3	2	7	22

- Date: September 14
- Location: Soldier Field
- Referee: Bob McElwee
- TV announcers (CBS): Tim Ryan and Johnny Morris

=== Week 3 ===
Team	1	2	3	4	Total
• Vikings	14	7	7	6	34
Bears	0	0	0	14	14

- Date: September 21
- Location: Soldier Field
- TV announcers (CBS): Curt Gowdy and George Allen

=== Week 4 ===
Team	1	2	3	4	Total
Bears	3	0	0	0	3
• Steelers	7	17	7	7	38

- Date: September 28
- Location: Three Rivers Stadium
- Referee: Jerry Seeman
- TV announcers (CBS): Frank Glieber and Roger Staubach

=== Week 5 ===
Team	1	2	3	4	Total
Buccaneers	0	0	0	0	0
• Bears	0	3	10	10	23

- Date: October 6
- Location: Soldier Field
- Referee: Ben Dreith
- Television network: ABC

=== Week 6 ===
Team	1	2	3	4	Total
Bears	0	0	7	0	7
• Vikings	3	0	3	7	13

- Date: October 12
- Location: Metropolitan Stadium
- Referee: Jerry Markbreit
- TV announcers (CBS): Tim Ryan and Johnny Morris

=== Week 7 ===
Team	1	2	3	4	Total
Lions	0	0	0	7	7
• Bears	7	3	7	7	24

- Date: October 19
- Location: Soldier Field
- Referee: Gordon McCarter
- TV announcers (CBS): Tim Ryan and Johnny Morris

=== Week 8 ===
Team	1	2	3	4	Total
Bears	0	0	14	0	14
• Eagles	7	0	7	3	17

- Date: October 26
- Location: Veterans Stadium
- Referee: Red Cashion
- TV announcers (CBS): Pat Summerall and Tom Brookshier

=== Week 9 ===
Team	1	2	3	4	Total
Bears	0	0	7	14	21
• Browns	3	7	3	14	27

- Date: November 3
- Location: Cleveland Stadium
- Referee: Dick Jorgensen
- Television network: ABC

=== Week 10 ===
Team	1	2	3	4	Total
Redskins	0	0	14	7	21
• Bears	21	14	0	0	35

- Date: November 9
- Location: Soldier Field
- TV announcers (CBS): Vin Scully and George Allen

=== Week 11 ===
Team	1	2	3	4	Total
• Oilers	0	7	3	0	10
Bears	0	6	0	0	6

- Date: November 16
- Location: Soldier Field
- Referee: Bob Frederic
- Television network: NBC

=== Week 12 ===
Team	1	2	3	4	Total
Bears	7	3	7	0	17
• Falcons	0	14	0	14	28

- Date: November 23
- Location: Atlanta-Fulton County Stadium

=== Week 13 ===
Week Thirteen: Chicago Bears (4–8) at Detroit Lions (7–5)

Quarter	1	2	3	4	OT	Total
Bears	0	3	0	14	6	23
Lions	3	7	7	0	0	17

at Pontiac Silverdome, Pontiac, Michigan

- Date: November 27, 1980
- Game time: 12:30 p.m. EST
- Game weather: Indoors (dome)
- Game attendance: 75,397
- Referee: Fred Silva
- TV announcers (CBS): Pat Summerall, Tom Brookshier, and Irv Cross
- Pro-Football-Reference.com

Game information

First quarter

- DET – Eddie Murray 34-yard field goal. Lions 3–0. Drive:

Second quarter

- DET – Billy Sims 47-yard pass from Gary Danielson (Eddie Murray kick). Lions 10–0. Drive:
- CHI – Bob Thomas 24-yard field goal. Lions 10–3. Drive:

Third quarter

- DET – Gary Danielson 1-yard run (Eddie Murray kick). Lions 17–3. Drive:

Fourth quarter

- CHI – Bob Fisher 20-yard pass from Vince Evans (Bob Thomas kick). Lions 17–10. Drive:
- CHI – Vince Evans 4-yard run (Bob Thomas kick), 0:00. Tie 17–17. Drive: 14 plays, 94 yards.

Overtime

- CHI – Dave Williams 94-yard kickoff return. Bears 23–17.

Top passers

- CHI – Vince Evans – 11/22, 167 yards, TD
- DET – Gary Danielson – 9/21, 156 yards, TD

Top rushers

- CHI – Walter Payton – 18 rushes, 123 yards
- DET – Billy Sims – 19 rushes, 72 yards

Top receivers

- CHI – James Scott – 6 receptions, 106 yards
- DET – Ray Williams – 3 receptions, 50 yards

=== Week 14 ===
Team	1	2	3	4	Total
Packers	0	7	0	0	7
• Bears	0	28	13	20	61

- Date: December 7
- Location: Soldier Field, Chicago, Illinois
- Game start: 1:00 p.m.
- Game weather: 56 °F (13 °C), wind 10 mph (16 km/h)
- Referee: Chuck Heberling
- TV announcers (CBS): Tim Ryan and Johnny Morris

Scoring summary
2	CHI	Walter Payton 1 yard run (Bob Thomas kick)	Bears 7–0
2	CHI	Walter Payton 3 yard run (Bob Thomas kick)	Bears 14–0
2	CHI	Roland Harper 1 yard run (Bob Thomas kick)	Bears 21–0
2	GB	James Lofton 15 yard pass from Lynn Dickey (Jan Stenerud kick)	Bears 21–7
2	CHI	Brian Baschnagel 4 yard pass from Vince Evans (Bob Thomas kick)	Bears 28–7
3	CHI	Robin Earl 9 yard pass from Vince Evans (kick failed)	Bears 34–7
3	CHI	Rickey Watts 53 yard pass from Vince Evans (Bob Thomas kick)	Bears 41–7
4	CHI	Walter Payton 14 yard run (Bob Thomas kick)	Bears 48–7
4	CHI	Len Walterscheid 36 yard interception return (Bob Thomas kick)	Bears 55–7
4	CHI	Willie McClendon 1 yard run (kick failed)	Bears 61–7

=== Week 15 ===
Team	1	2	3	4	OT	Total
• Bengals	7	7	0	0	3	17
Bears	0	7	0	7	0	14

- Date: December 14
- Location: Soldier Field

=== Week 16 ===
Team	1	2	3	4	Total
• Bears	0	7	7	0	14
Buccaneers	10	0	0	3	13

- Date: December 21
- Location: Tampa Stadium

== Standings ==
NFC Central
	W	L	T	PCT	DIV	CONF	PF	PA	STK
^{(3)} Minnesota Vikings	9	7	0	.563	5–3	8–4	317	308	L1
Detroit Lions	9	7	0	.563	5–3	9–5	334	272	W2
Chicago Bears	7	9	0	.438	5–3	7–5	304	264	W1
Tampa Bay Buccaneers	5	10	1	.344	1–6–1	4–7–1	271	341	L3
Green Bay Packers	5	10	1	.344	3–4–1	4–7–1	231	371	L4
