= 1979 Chicago Bears season =

NFL team season

- Owner: George Halas
- General manager: Jim Finks
- Head coach: Neill Armstrong
- Home stadium: Soldier Field

Results
- Record: 10–6
- Division place: 2nd NFC Central
- Playoffs: Lost Wild Card Playoffs (at Eagles) 17–27

The 1979 Chicago Bears season was their 60th regular season and 14th postseason completed in the National Football League. The team finished with a 10–6 record under second year coach Neill Armstrong but lost to the Philadelphia Eagles 27–17 in the opening round of the playoffs.

== Offseason ==
=== NFL draft ===
1979 Chicago Bears draft
Round	Pick	Player	Position	College	Notes
1	4	Dan Hampton * ^{†}	Defensive end	Arkansas	
1	9	Al Harris	Defensive end	Arizona State	
2	39	Rickey Watts	Wide receiver	Tulsa	
3	66	Willie McClendon	Running back	Georgia	
6	147	John Sullivan	Linebacker	Illinois	
7	174	Lee Kunz	Linebacker	Nebraska	
8	203	Rick Moss	Defensive back	Purdue	
9	230	Jerome Heavens	Running back	Notre Dame	
10	257	Joe Restic	Defensive back	Notre Dame	
11	286	Bob Wright	Offensive tackle	Cincinnati	
12	312	Dave Becker	Safety	Iowa	
Made roster † Pro Football Hall of Fame * Made at least one Pro Bowl during career

=== Undrafted free agents ===
1979 undrafted free agents of note
Player	Position	College
Maurice Horton	Wide receiver	No College
Pete Kraker	Quarterback	Northern Illinois
Carl Larson	Center	St. Cloud State
Jim Moore	Center	Wisconsin
Mark Moselle	Guard	Wisconsin–Superior
Phil Olson	Tight end	Dartmouth
Dave Petzke	Wide receiver	Northern Illinois
Pat Wacker	Wide receiver	North Dakota

== Roster ==
1979 Chicago Bears roster
Quarterbacks (QB): 7 Bob Avellini; 15 Mike Phipps; Running backs (RB): 39 Robin Earl; 37 Willie McClendon; 34 Walter Payton; 25 Lonnie Perrin; 22 Dave Williams; Wide receivers (WR): 84 Brian Baschnagel; 83 Kris Haines; 81 Harry Washington; 80 Rickey Watts; Tight ends (TE): 87 Mike Cobb; 88 Greg Latta	Offensive linemen (OL): 64 Ted Albrecht T; 63 Tony Ardizzone C; 60 Lynn Boden G; 65 Noah Jackson G; 62 Dan Jiggetts T; 70 Dennis Lick T; 52 Dan Neal C; 69 Revie Sorey G; Defensive linemen (DL): 99 Dan Hampton DE; 90 Al Harris DE; 53 Tommy Hart DE; 73 Mike Hartenstine DE; 68 Jim Osborne DT; 82 Alan Page DT; 76 Ron Rydalch DT	Linebackers (LB): 55 Doug Buffone MLB; 59 Gary Campbell OLB; 51 Bruce Herron OLB; 54 Tom Hicks MLB; 57 Lee Kunz OLB; 50 Mark Merrill OLB; 58 Jerry Muckensturm OLB; Defensive backs (DB): 48 Allan Ellis CB; 45 Gary Fencik SS; 36 Wentford Gaines CB; 24 Virgil Livers CB; 46 Doug Plank FS; 44 Terry Schmidt CB; 47 Mike Spivey CB; 23 Len Walterscheid FS; Special teams (ST): 86 Bob Parsons P; 16 Bob Thomas K	Reserve: 79 Lionel Antoine T (IR); 8 Vince Evans QB (IR); 35 Roland Harper FB (IR); 74 Jerry Meyers DE (IR); 71 Rocco Moore T (IR); -- Golden Richards WR (IR); 85 Steve Schubert WR (IR); 89 James Scott WR (IR); 72 Brad Shearer DT (IR); 30 John Skibinski RB (IR); Rookies in italics

== Schedule ==
Week	Date	Opponent	Result	Record	Venue	Attendance
1	September 2	**Green Bay Packers**	**W** 6–3	1–0	Soldier Field	56,515
2	September 9	**Minnesota Vikings**	**W** 26–7	2–0	Soldier Field	53,231
3	September 16	at Dallas Cowboys	**L** 20–24	2–1	Texas Stadium	64,056
4	September 23	at Miami Dolphins	**L** 16–31	2–2	Miami Orange Bowl	66,011
5	September 30	**Tampa Bay Buccaneers**	**L** 13–17	2–3	Soldier Field	55,258
6	October 7	at Buffalo Bills	**W** 7–0	3–3	Rich Stadium	73,383
7	October 14	New England Patriots	**L** 7–27	3–4	Soldier Field	54,128
8	October 21	at **Minnesota Vikings**	**L** 27–30	3–5	Metropolitan Stadium	41,164
9	October 28	at San Francisco 49ers	**W** 28–27	4–5	Candlestick Park	42,773
10	November 4	**Detroit Lions**	**W** 35–7	5–5	Soldier Field	50,108
11	November 11	Los Angeles Rams	**W** 27–23	6–5	Soldier Field	51,483
12	November 18	New York Jets	**W** 23–13	7–5	Soldier Field	52,635
13	November 22	at **Detroit Lions**	**L** 0–20	7–6	Pontiac Silverdome	66,219
14	December 2	at **Tampa Bay Buccaneers**	**W** 14–0	8–6	Tampa Stadium	69,508
15	December 9	at **Green Bay Packers**	**W** 15–14	9–6	Lambeau Field	54,207
16	December 16	St. Louis Cardinals	**W** 42–6	10–6	Soldier Field	42,810
Note: Intra-division opponents are in **bold** text.

=== Game summaries ===
==== Week 1 ====
- Network: CBS
- Announcers: Dick Stockton and Johnny Morris

Bob Thomas booted a pair of field goals and Walter Payton rushed for 125 yards on 36 carries in 80 degree heat as the Bears won their opener. Thomas who had a field goal attempt blocked by Packers' Mike Hunt in the first quarter converted from 25 and 19 yards in the second quarter and the Bears banked on an aggressive defense which was credited with five sacks for the triumph. Chester Marcol, who had a field goal blocked by Virgil Livers, later connected for Green Bay's only score with a 28 yarder. The Bears defense aided by a pair of excellent punts by Bob Parsons, kept the Packers in tough field condition in the first half when Green Bay was limited to only three first downs.

==== Week 14 ====
Team	1	2	3	4	Total
• Bears	7	7	0	0	14
Buccaneers	0	0	0	0	0

- Date: December 2
- Location: Tampa Stadium, Tampa, Florida
- Game start: 1:00 p.m.
- Game weather: 53 °F (12 °C), wind 9 mph (14 km/h)
- Referee: Fred Silva
- Television network: CBS

Scoring summary
1	CHI	Walter Payton 1 yard run (Bob Thomas kick)	Bears 7–0
2	CHI	Dave Williams 13 yard pass from Mike Phipps (Bob Thomas kick)	Bears 14–0

==== Week 15: at Green Bay Packers ====
Week 15: Chicago Bears at Green Bay Packers

Quarter	1	2	3	4	Total
**Bears**	3	3	0	9	**15**
Packers	0	7	0	7	**14**

at Lambeau Field, Green Bay, Wisconsin

- Date: December 9, 1979
- Game time: 1:00 p.m. CST
- Game weather: Overcast, 29 °F (−2 °C)
- TV announcers (CBS): Pat Summerall and Sonny Jurgensen

Game information

**First quarter**

**Second quarter**

**Third quarter**

**Fourth quarter**

Top passers

- CHI – Mike Phipps – 10/25, 113 yards, 1 INT
- GB – Lynn Dickey – 20/37, 283 yards, 2 TD, 2 INT

Top rushers

- CHI – Walter Payton – 25 rushes, 115 yards
- GB – Ricky Patton – 18 rushes, 35 yards

Top receivers

- CHI – Rickey Watts – 4 receptions, 68 yards
- GB – James Lofton – 6 receptions, 112 yards, 1 TD

== Playoffs ==
Round	Date	Opponent	Result	Record	Venue	Attendance
Wildcard	December 23	at Philadelphia Eagles	L 17–27	0–1	Veterans Stadium	69,397

=== Standings ===
NFC Central
	W	L	T	PCT	DIV	CONF	PF	PA	STK
Tampa Bay Buccaneers^{(2)}	10	6	0	.625	6–2	8–6	273	237	W1
Chicago Bears^{(5)}	10	6	0	.625	5–3	8–4	306	249	W3
Minnesota Vikings	7	9	0	.438	5–3	6–6	259	337	L1
Green Bay Packers	5	11	0	.313	3–5	4–8	246	316	W1
Detroit Lions	2	14	0	.125	1–7	2–10	219	365	L3
