= 1978 Chicago Bears season =

NFL team season

- Owner: George Halas
- General manager: Jim Finks
- Head coach: Neill Armstrong
- Home stadium: Soldier Field

Results
- Record: 7–9
- Division place: 4th NFC Central
- Playoffs: Did not qualify

The 1978 season was the Chicago Bears' 59th in the National Football League, and their first under head coach Neill Armstrong. The team failed to improve on their 9–5 record from 1977 to finish at 7–9, and failed to make the playoffs for the 14th time in the past 15 seasons.

== Offseason ==
=== NFL draft ===
1978 Chicago Bears draft
Round	Pick	Player	Position	College	Notes
3	74	Brad Shearer	Defensive tackle	Texas	
6	139	John Skibinski	Running back	Purdue	
6	158	Mekeli Ieremia	Defensive end	BYU	
7	185	Herman Jones	Wide receiver	Ohio State	
8	212	George Freitas	Tight end	California	
9	244	Mike Martin	Linebacker	Kentucky	
10	271	Ben Zambiasi	Linebacker	Georgia	
11	298	Walt Underwood	Defensive end	USC	
12	325	Lew Sibley	Linebacker	LSU	
Made roster

=== Undrafted free agents ===
1978 undrafted free agents of note
Player	Position	College
Reggie Arnold	Wide receiver	Purdue
Rick Hansing	Center	Bemidji State
Mike Morgan	Running back	Wisconsin
Jack Steptoe	Wide receiver	Utah
Mike Ulmer	Defensive back	Doane

== Roster ==
1978 Chicago Bears roster
Quarterbacks (QB): 7 Bob Avellini; 8 Vince Evans; 15 Mike Phipps; Running backs (RB): 25 Art Best; 39 Robin Earl; 35 Roland Harper; 34 Walter Payton; 30 John Skibinski; Wide receivers (WR): 84 Brian Baschnagel; 83 Golden Richards; 85 Steve Schubert; 89 James Scott; Tight ends (TE): 87 Mike Cobb; 88 Greg Latta	Offensive linemen (OL): 64 Ted Albrecht T; 79 Lionel Antoine T; 65 Noah Jackson G; 62 Dan Jiggetts T; 70 Dennis Lick T; 63 Jon Morris C; 52 Dan Neal C; 75 Jeff Sevy G; 69 Revie Sorey G; Defensive linemen (DL): 53 Tommy Hart DE; 73 Mike Hartenstine DE; 74 Jerry Meyers DE; 68 Jim Osborne DT; 82 Alan Page DT; 76 Ron Rydalch DT; 72 Brad Shearer DT	Linebackers (LB): 55 Doug Buffone OLB; 59 Gary Campbell OLB; 50 Chris Devlin OLB; 51 Bruce Herron OLB; 58 Jerry Muckensturm OLB; 57 Don Rives MLB; Defensive backs (DB): 45 Gary Fencik SS; 36 Wentford Gaines CB; 24 Virgil Livers CB; 46 Doug Plank FS; 47 Mike Spivey CB; 44 Terry Schmidt CB; 23 Len Walterscheid FS; Special teams (ST): 86 Bob Parsons P; 16 Bob Thomas K	Reserve: -- Waymond Bryant LB (IR); 48 Allan Ellis CB (IR); 38 George Freitas TE (IR); 54 Tom Hicks LB (IR); 22 Johnny Musso RB (IR); 83 Steve Rivera WR (IR); Rookies in italics

== Schedule ==
Week	Date	Opponent	Result	Record	Venue	Attendance
1	September 3	St. Louis Cardinals	**W** 17–10	1–0	Soldier Field	52,791
2	September 10	at San Francisco 49ers	**W** 16–13	2–0	Candlestick Park	49,502
3	September 17	at **Detroit Lions**	**W** 19–0	3–0	Pontiac Silverdome	65,982
4	September 25	**Minnesota Vikings**	**L** 20–24	3–1	Soldier Field	53,551
5	October 1	Oakland Raiders	**L** 19–25	3–2	Soldier Field	52,848
6	October 8	at **Green Bay Packers**	**L** 14–24	3–3	Lambeau Field	56,267
7	October 16	at Denver Broncos	**L** 7–16	3–4	Mile High Stadium	75,008
8	October 22	at **Tampa Bay Buccaneers**	**L** 19–33	3–5	Tampa Stadium	68,146
9	October 29	**Detroit Lions**	**L** 17–21	3–6	Soldier Field	53,378
10	November 5	Seattle Seahawks	**L** 29–31	3–7	Soldier Field	50,697
11	November 12	at **Minnesota Vikings**	**L** 14–17	3–8	Metropolitan Stadium	43,286
12	November 19	Atlanta Falcons	**W** 13–7	4–8	Soldier Field	46,022
13	November 26	**Tampa Bay Buccaneers**	**W** 14–3	5–8	Soldier Field	42,373
14	December 4	at San Diego Chargers	**L** 7–40	5–9	San Diego Stadium	48,492
15	December 10	**Green Bay Packers**	**W** 14–0	6–9	Soldier Field	34,306
16	December 16	at Washington Redskins	**W** 14–10	7–9	RFK Stadium	49,774
Note: Intra-division opponents are in **bold** text.

== Game summaries ==
=== Week 2 ===
"The 100 yards was nice, but it doesn't mean a thing since we lost." O. J. Simpson said after winning his first confrontation with Walter Payton. Simpson had 108 yards to Payton's 62. - But Simpson's fumble proved to be a pivotal one. He recovered the ball but lost 6 yards on the play, and the 49ers, leading by four points in the fourth quarter, had to go to the air to try to maintain possession. Doug Buffone then intercepts and Chicago wound up with the winning touchdown.

Team	1	2	3	4	Total
• Bears	3	3	3	7	16
49ers	7	3	0	3	13

- Date: September 10
- Location: Candlestick Park, San Francisco, California
- Game start: 1:00 p.m.
- Game weather: 64 °F (18 °C), wind 13 mph (21 km/h)
- Referee: Dick Jorgensen
- TV announcers (CBS): Frank Glieber Johnny Morris

Scoring summary
1	CHI	Bob Thomas 32 yard field goal	Bears 3–0
1	SF	O. J. Simpson 8 yard pass from Steve DeBerg (Ray Wersching kick)	49ers 7–3
2	CHI	Bob Thomas 44 yard field goal	49ers 7–6
2	SF	Ray Wersching 44 yard field goal	49ers 10–6
3	CHI	Bob Thomas 38 yard field goal	49ers 10–9
4	SF	Ray Wersching 27 yard field goal	49ers 13–9
4	CHI	Roland Harper 1 yard run (Bob Thomas kick)	Bears 16–13

=== Week 3 ===
- Television: CBS
- Announcers: Tim Ryan and Johnny Morris

Chicago scored three times in about four minutes in the third quarter, including a 40-yard touchdown pass from Bob Avellini to James Scott as the Bears go 3–0 to stay in first place and extend their regular season winning streak to 9. The third quarter scoring barrage began with a 28-yard field goal by Bob Thomas at 10:41. Less than Three minutes later Tommy Hart tackled quarterback Greg Landry in the end zone for a safety. Then the Bears wrapped up the scoring with Avellini's 40-yard bomb to wide receiver James Scott over the head of cornerback James Hunter.

=== Week 6 at Packers ===
Week Six: Chicago Bears (3–2) at Green Bay Packers (4–1)

Quarter	1	2	3	4	Total
Bears	0	0	0	14	14
Packers	0	3	14	7	24

at Lambeau Field, Green Bay, Wisconsin

- Date: October 8
- Game time: 2:00 p.m.
- Game weather: 40 °F (4 °C)
- Game attendance: 56,267
- Box Score

Game information

First quarter

- No scoring

Second quarter

- GB – Chester Marcol 41-yard field goal. Packers 3–0.

Third quarter

- GB – Terdell Middleton 2-yard run (Chester Marcol kick). Packers 10–0.
- GB – Steve Luke 63-yard interception return (Chester Marcol kick). Packers 17–0.

Fourth quarter

- CHI – James Scott 15-yard pass from Bob Avellini (Bob Thomas kick). Packers 17–7.
- GB – James Lofton 58-yard pass from David Whitehurst (Chester Marcol kick). Packers 24–7.
- CHI – James Scott 17-yard pass from Bob Avellini (Bob Thomas kick). Packers 24–14.

Top passers

- CHI – Bob Avellini – 23/37, 224 yards, 2 TD, 3 INT
- GB – David Whitehurst – 6/12, 88 yards, TD

Top rushers

- CHI – Walter Payton – 19 rushes, 82 yards
- GB – Terdell Middleton – 16 rushes, 64 yards, TD

Top receivers

- CHI – James Scott – 9 receptions, 113 yards, 2 TD
- GB – James Lofton – 2 receptions, 65 yards, TD

=== Week 16 ===
Team	1	2	3	4	Total
• Bears	7	0	7	0	14
Redskins	0	3	0	7	10

- Date: December 16
- Location: RFK Stadium • Washington, D.C.
- Game start: 1:00 p.m. EST
- Game weather: 46 °F (8 °C) • Wind 11 mph (18 km/h)

Scoring summary
1	CHI	Walter Payton 44-yard run (Bob Thomas kick)	Bears 7–0
2	WSH	Mark Moseley 33-yard field goal	Bears 7–3
3	CHI	Steve Schubert 73-yard punt return (Bob Thomas kick)	Bears 14–3
4	WSH	Jean Fugett 17-yard pass from Billy Kilmer (Mark Moseley kick)	Bears 14–10

== Standings ==
NFC Central
	W	L	T	PCT	DIV	CONF	PF	PA	STK
^{(3)} Minnesota Vikings	8	7	1	.531	5–2–1	7–4–1	294	306	L2
Green Bay Packers	8	7	1	.531	5–2–1	6–5–1	249	269	L2
Detroit Lions	7	9	0	.438	4–4	5–7	290	300	W2
Chicago Bears	7	9	0	.438	3–5	7–5	253	274	W2
Tampa Bay Buccaneers	5	11	0	.313	2–6	3–11	241	259	L4
