= 1975 Chicago Bears season =

NFL team season

- Owner: George Halas
- General manager: Jim Finks
- Head coach: Jack Pardee
- Home stadium: Soldier Field

Results
- Record: 4–10
- Division place: 3rd NFC Central
- Playoffs: Did not qualify

The 1975 Chicago Bears season was their 56th regular season in the National Football League. The team matched their 4–10 record from 1974, in the first season under head coach Jack Pardee.

The 1975 Bears are the only NFL team to have been outscored by 25 points six different times during a 14-game season, a record for futility that has that has only been matched once under the current 16-game format.

== Offseason ==
=== NFL draft ===
1975 Chicago Bears draft
Round	Pick	Player	Position	College	Notes
1	4	Walter Payton * ^{†}	Running back	Jackson State	
2	31	Mike Hartenstine	Defensive end	Penn State	
4	83	Virgil Livers	Cornerback	Western Kentucky	
5	110	Revie Sorey	Guard	Illinois	
6	135	Bob Avellini	Quarterback	Maryland	
6	151	Tom Hicks	Linebacker	Illinois	
7	178	Earl Douthitt	Safety	Iowa	
8	197	Joe Harris	Linebacker	Georgia Tech	
9	212	Roger Stillwell	Defensive tackle	Stanford	
10	254	Mike Julius	Guard	St. Thomas	
11	264	Mike Dean	Kicker	Texas	
12	291	Doug Plank	Safety	Ohio State	
13	316	Charles McDaniel	Running back	Louisiana Tech	
14	343	Walter Hartfield	Running back	Southwest Texas State	
15	368	Steve Marcantonio	Wide receiver	Miami (FL)	
16	395	Witt Beckman	Wide receiver	Miami (FL)	
17	420	Roland Harper	Running back	Louisiana Tech	
Made roster † Pro Football Hall of Fame * Made at least one Pro Bowl during career

=== Undrafted free agents ===
1975 undrafted free agents of note
Player	Position	College
Barry Brady	Wide receiver	Alcorn State
Greg Engebos	Cornerback	Minnesota

== Roster ==
1975 Chicago Bears roster
Quarterbacks (QB): 7 Bob Avellini; 11 Virgil Carter; 19 Gary Huff; Running backs (RB): 20 Mike Adamle; 36 Tom Donchez; 35 Roland Harper; 22 Johnny Musso; 34 Walter Payton; Wide receivers (WR): 27 Bob Grim; 80 Bo Rather; 85 Steve Schubert; Tight ends (TE): 81 Gary Butler; 88 Greg Latta; 86 Bob Parsons P	Offensive linemen (OL): 79 Lionel Antoine T; 74 Bob Asher T; 65 Noah Jackson G; 51 Dan Neal C; 78 Bob Newton G; 63 Mark Nordquist G; 75 Jeff Sevy T; 69 Revie Sorey G; Defensive linemen (DL): 60 Wally Chambers DT; 84 Richard Harris DE; 73 Mike Hartenstine DE; 72 Gary Hrivnak DE; 68 Jim Osborne DT; 76 Ron Rydalch DT; 71 Roger Stillwell DT	Linebackers (LB): 52 John Babinecz OLB; 50 Waymond Bryant OLB; 55 Doug Buffone OLB; 54 Larry Ely MLB; 59 Carl Gersbach MLB; 58 Bob Pifferini OLB; Defensive backs (DB): 45 Craig Clemons FS; 43 Earl Douthitt SS; 48 Allan Ellis CB; 31 Bill Knox CB; 24 Virgil Livers CB; 46 Doug Plank SS; 21 Nemiah Wilson CB; Special teams (ST): 16 Bob Thomas K	Reserve: 53 Dan Peiffer C (IR); 87 Tom Reynolds WR (IR); 57 Don Rives LB (IR); 25 Ronnie Shanklin WR (IR); -- Joe Taylor CB (PUP); Rookies in italics

== Regular season ==
=== Schedule ===
Week	Date	Opponent	Result	Record	Venue	Attendance
1	September 21	Baltimore Colts	**L** 7–35	0–1	Soldier Field	54,152
2	September 28	Philadelphia Eagles	**W** 15–13	1–1	Soldier Field	48,071
3	October 5	at Minnesota Vikings	**L** 3–28	1–2	Metropolitan Stadium	47,578
4	October 12	at Detroit Lions	**L** 7–27	1–3	Pontiac Municipal Stadium	74,032
5	October 19	at Pittsburgh Steelers	**L** 3–34	1–4	Three Rivers Stadium	47,579
6	October 27	Minnesota Vikings	**L** 9–13	1–5	Soldier Field	51,259
7	November 2	Miami Dolphins	**L** 13–46	1–6	Soldier Field	57,455
8	November 9	Green Bay Packers	**W** 27–14	2–6	Soldier Field	48,738
9	November 16	at San Francisco 49ers	**L** 3–31	2–7	Candlestick Park	41,726
10	November 23	at Los Angeles Rams	**L** 10–38	2–8	Los Angeles Memorial Coliseum	64,979
11	November 30	at Green Bay Packers	**L** 7–28	2–9	Lambeau Field	56,267
12	December 7	Detroit Lions	**W** 25–21	3–9	Soldier Field	37,772
13	December 14	St. Louis Cardinals	**L** 20–34	3–10	Soldier Field	35,052
14	December 21	at New Orleans Saints	**W** 42–17	4–10	Louisiana Superdome	33,371
Note: Intra-division opponents are in **bold** text.

=== Season summary ===
==== Week 2 ====
Team	1	2	3	4	Total
Eagles	3	3	0	7	13
• **Bears**	0	9	0	6	15

- Date: September 28
- Location: Soldier Field • Chicago, Illinois
- Game start: 1:00 p.m.
- Game weather: 56 °F (13 °C), wind 6 mph (9.7 km/h)

Scoring summary
1		PHI	Horst Muhlmann 44-yard field goal	Eagles 3–0
2		CHI	Bob Thomas 44-yard field goal	Tie 3–3
2		CHI	Cid Edwards 7-yard pass from Gary Huff (kick failed)	Bears 9–3
2		PHI	Horst Muhlmann 43-yard field goal	Bears 9–6
4		CHI	Bob Thomas 24-yard field goal	Bears 12–6
4	4:09	PHI	Harold Carmichael 14-yard pass from Roman Gabriel (Horst Muhlmann kick)	Eagles 13–12
4	:08	CHI	Bob Thomas 26-yard field goal	Bears 15–12

==== Week 8 ====
Team	1	2	3	4	Total
Packers	0	7	0	7	14
• **Bears**	10	7	10	0	27

- Date: November 9
- Location: Soldier Field, Chicago
- Game start: 1:00 p.m.
- Game weather: 58 °F (14 °C), wind 12 mph (19 km/h)

Scoring summary
1	CHI	Bob Thomas 34 yard field goal	Bears 3–0
1	CHI	Bob Parsons 12 yard pass from Gary Huff (Bob Thomas kick)	Bears 10–0
2	GB	Steve Odom 42 yard pass from Don Milan (Joe Danelo kick)	Bears 10–7
2	CHI	Walter Payton 5 yard run (Bob Thomas kick)	Bears 17–7
3	CHI	Bob Thomas 48 yard field goal	Bears 20–7
3	CHI	Craig Clemons 76 yard interception return (Bob Thomas kick)	Bears 27–7
4	GB	Barry Smith 18 yard pass from Carlos Brown (Joe Danelo kick)	Bears 27–14

=== Standings ===
NFC Central
	W	L	T	PCT	DIV	CONF	PF	PA	STK
^{(1)} Minnesota Vikings	12	2	0	.857	5–1	8–2	377	180	W1
Detroit Lions	7	7	0	.500	4–2	6–5	245	262	L1
Chicago Bears	4	10	0	.286	2–4	4–7	191	379	W1
Green Bay Packers	4	10	0	.286	1–5	4–7	226	285	W1
