= 1982 Chicago Bears season =

NFL team season

- Owner: George Halas
- General manager: Jim Finks
- Head coach: Mike Ditka
- Home stadium: Soldier Field

Results
- Record: 3–6
- Division place: 12th NFC (5th NFC Central)
- Playoffs: Did not qualify
- All-Pros: 2: DT Dan Hampton; SS Gary Fencik
- Pro Bowlers: 1: DT Dan Hampton

The 1982 Chicago Bears season was the team's strike-shortened 63rd season in the National Football League, and their first under head coach Mike Ditka. The team failed to improve on their 6–10 record from 1981 to finish at 3–6 and failed to make the playoffs for the third consecutive season. The Bears would end up being the only team in the NFC Central to not make the playoffs in 1982. This particular feat would be repeated in a full 16-game season in 1997.

The strike also prevented the Bears–Packers rivalry from being played this year, making the Lions–Packers rivalry the longest-running annual series in the league.

This would be the final full season that George Halas was the Bears' owner, as he died during the following season on October 31, 1983, at the age of 88.

== Offseason ==
=== 1982 NFL draft ===
1982 Chicago Bears draft
Round	Pick	Player	Position	College	Notes
1	5	Jim McMahon *	Quarterback	Brigham Young	
3	62	Tim Wrightman	Tight end	UCLA	
4	89	Dennis Gentry	Running back	Baylor	
5	116	Perry Hartnett	Offensive tackle	Southern Methodist	
5	134	Dennis Tabron	Defensive back	Duke	
6	146	Kurt Becker	Guard	Michigan	
7	173	Henry Waechter	Defensive tackle	Nebraska	
8	200	Jerry Doerger	Tackle	Wisconsin	
9	230	Mike Hatchett	Defensive back	Texas	
10	257	Joe Turner	Defensive back	USC	
11	283	Guy Boliaux	Linebacker	Wisconsin	
12	313	Ricky Young	Linebacker	Oklahoma State	
Made roster † Pro Football Hall of Fame * Made at least one Pro Bowl during career

=== Undrafted free agents ===
After the draft, the Bears signed 2 undrafted free agents, linebacker Dan Rains from Cincinnati and running back Calvin Thomas of Illinois.

1982 undrafted free agents of note
Player	Position	College
Mark Bornholdt	Running back	Ball State
Fred Brockington	Wide receiver	Michigan
Brett Carsello	Center	Wisconsin–Eau Claire
Clinton Davenport	Tackle	Eastern Illinois
Bill Huskisson	Defensive tackle	Western Illinois
Bret Hybte	Linebacker	Central Michigan
Dean Masztak	Tight end	Notre Dame
Jeff Orlando	Defensive end	Cal Lutheran
Terry Porter	Wide receiver	Montclair State
Dennis Runck	Running back	Dartmouth
Jim Schtetzer	Punter	Lees–McRae College
Calvin Thomas	Running back	Illinois
Steve Veith	Kicker	Wisconsin

== Roster ==
1982 Chicago Bears roster
Quarterbacks (QB): 7 Bob Avellini; 8 Vince Evans; 9 Jim McMahon; Running backs (RB): 29 Dennis Gentry; 35 Roland Harper; 37 Willie McClendon; 34 Walter Payton; 26 Matt Suhey; 33 Calvin Thomas; Wide receivers (WR): 84 Brian Baschnagel; 83 Jim Fitzpatrick; 82 Ken Margerum; 80 Rickey Watts; Tight ends (TE): 81 Robin Earl; 85 Emery Moorehead; 88 Brooks Williams	Offensive linemen (OL): 79 Kurt Becker G; 72 Jerry Doerger T; 71 Perry Hartnett G; 63 Jay Hilgenberg C; 65 Noah Jackson G; 62 Dan Jiggetts T; 67 Phil McKinnely T; 52 Dan Neal C; 78 Keith Van Horne T; Defensive linemen (DL): 99 Dan Hampton DT; 90 Al Harris DE; 73 Mike Hartenstine DE; 76 Steve McMichael DT; 68 Jim Osborne DT; 75 Henry Waechter DE	Linebackers (LB): 54 Brian Cabral OLB; 59 Gary Campbell OLB; 57 Al Chesley MLB; 51 Bruce Herron OLB; 58 Jerry Muckensturm OLB; 50 Mike Singletary MLB; 53 Dan Rains OLB; 55 Otis Wilson OLB; Defensive backs (DB): 25 Todd Bell SS; 45 Gary Fencik SS; 24 Jeff Fisher CB; 21 Leslie Frazier CB; 20 Reuben Henderson CB; 44 Terry Schmidt CB; 23 Len Walterscheid FS; 43 Walt Williams CB; Special teams (ST): 86 Bob Parsons P; 16 Bob Thomas K	Reserve: 64 Ted Albrecht T (IR); 14 Tim Clifford QB (PUP); 57 Bruce Huther LB (IR); 46 Doug Plank S (IR); 89 James Scott WR (IR); 69 Revie Sorey G (IR); 74 Jeff Williams G (IR); Rookies in italics

== Regular season ==
=== Schedule ===
Week	Date	Opponent	Result	Record	Venue	Attendance
1	September 12	at **Detroit Lions**	**L** 10–17	0–1	Pontiac Silverdome	71,337
2	September 19	New Orleans Saints	**L** 0–10	0–2	Soldier Field	56,600
	September 26	at San Francisco 49ers	canceled	0–2	Candlestick Park	1982 NFL players strike
	October 3	**Minnesota Vikings**	canceled	0–2	Soldier Field	1982 NFL players strike
	October 10	**Green Bay Packers**	canceled	0–2	Soldier Field	1982 NFL players strike
	October 17	at St. Louis Cardinals	canceled	0–2	Busch Memorial Stadium	1982 NFL players strike
	October 24	**Tampa Bay Buccaneers**	canceled	0–2	Soldier Field	1982 NFL players strike
	October 31	at **Green Bay Packers**	canceled	0–2	Lambeau Field	1982 NFL players strike
	November 7	Atlanta Falcons	canceled	0–2	Soldier Field	1982 NFL players strike
	November 14	at **Tampa Bay Buccaneers**	postponed	0–2	Tampa Stadium	1982 NFL players strike
3	November 21	**Detroit Lions**	**W** 20–17	1–2	Soldier Field	46,783
4	November 28	at **Minnesota Vikings**	**L** 7–35	1–3	Hubert H. Humphrey Metrodome	54,724
5	December 5	New England Patriots	**W** 26–13	2–3	Soldier Field	36,973
6	December 12	at Seattle Seahawks	**L** 14–20	2–4	Kingdome	52,826
7	December 19	St. Louis Cardinals	**L** 7–10	2–5	Soldier Field	43,270
8	December 26	at Los Angeles Rams	**W** 34–26	3–5	Anaheim Stadium	46,502
9	January 2, 1983	at **Tampa Bay Buccaneers**	**L** 23–26 (OT)	3–6	Tampa Stadium	68,112
Note: Intra-division opponents are in **bold** text.

== Standings ==
NFC Central
	W	L	T	PCT	DIV	CONF	PF	PA	STK
^{(3)} Green Bay Packers	5	3	1	.611	1–2	4–2	226	169	L1
^{(4)} Minnesota Vikings	5	4	0	.556	3–1	4–1	158	178	W3
^{(7)} Tampa Bay Buccaneers	5	4	0	.556	2–1	3–3	158	178	W1
^{(8)} Detroit Lions	4	5	0	.444	3–3	4–4	181	176	W1
Chicago Bears	3	6	0	.333	1–3	2–5	141	174	L1

NFC
#	Team	W	L	T	PCT	PF	PA	STK
Seeded postseason qualifiers
1	Washington Redskins	8	1	0	.889	190	128	W4
2	Dallas Cowboys	6	3	0	.667	226	145	L2
3	Green Bay Packers	5	3	1	.611	226	169	L1
4 (Note: Minnesota (4–1), Atlanta (4–3), St. Louis (5–4), Tampa Bay (3–3) seeds were determined by best won-lost record in conference games.)	Minnesota Vikings	5	4	0	.556	187	198	W1
5	Atlanta Falcons	5	4	0	.556	183	199	L2
6	St. Louis Cardinals	5	4	0	.556	135	170	L1
7	Tampa Bay Buccaneers	5	4	0	.556	158	178	W3
8 (Note: Detroit finished ahead of New Orleans and the N.Y. Giants based on best conference record (4–4 to Saints’ 3–5 to Giants’ 3–5).)	Detroit Lions	4	5	0	.444	181	176	W1
Did not qualify for the postseason
9	New Orleans Saints	4	5	0	.444	129	160	W1
10	New York Giants	4	5	0	.444	164	160	W1
11 (Note: San Francisco finished ahead of Chicago, and Chicago finished ahead of Philadelphia, based on conference record (49ers’ 2–3 to Bears’ 2–5 to Eagles’ 1–5).)	San Francisco 49ers	3	6	0	.333	209	206	L1
12	Chicago Bears	3	6	0	.333	141	174	L1
13	Philadelphia Eagles	3	6	0	.333	191	195	L1
14	Los Angeles Rams	2	7	0	.222	200	250	W1
Tiebreakers
