= 1974 Little All-America college football team =

American college football all-star team

The 1974 Little All-America college football team, also known as the Small College All-America football team, is composed of college football players from small colleges and universities who were selected by the Associated Press (AP) as the best players at each position. For 1974, the AP selected three teams, each team having separate offensive and defensive platoons.

== First team ==
Position	Player	Team
Offense
Quarterback	Jim McMillan	Boise State
Running back	Walter Payton	Jackson State
Running back	Everett Talbert	Eastern Kentucky
Running back	Mike Thomas	UNLV
Wide receiver	Jim Myers	Kenyon
Tight end	Mike Barber	Louisiana Tech
Tackle	Caesar Douglas	Illinois Wesleyan
Tackle	John Passananti	Western Illinois
Guard	Herbert Scott	Virginia Union
Guard	Ray Sweeney	Delaware
Center	Mark King	Troy State
Defense
Defensive end	Jerry Dahl	North Dakota State
Defensive end	Cleveland Elam	Tennessee State
Defensive tackle	Fred Dean	Louisiana Tech
Defensive tackle	Gary "Big Hands" Johnson	Grambling State
Middle guard	Glenn Fleming	Northeast Louisiana
Linebacker	Robert Brazile	Jackson State
Linebacker	Mike McDonald	Catawba
Linebacker	Steve Yates	Western Carolina
Defensive back	Greg Grouwinkel	Nevada
Defensive back	Mark Johnson	Minnesota–Duluth
Defensive back	Virgil Livers	Western Kentucky

== Second team ==
Position	Player	Team
Offense
QB	Mike Franckowiak	Central Michigan
RB	Vincent Allen	Indiana State
RB	Don Hardeman	Texas A&I
RB	Jim Van Wagner	Michigan Tech
WR	Dwight Duncombe	South Dakota
TE	Fred Coleman	Northeast Louisiana
T	Brent Adams	Chattanooga
T	Greg Arnold	Capital
G	Fred Pointer	Southwest Texas State
G	Dan Schmitt	Coe
C	John Brooks	Elizabeth City State
Defense
DE	Lawrence Pillers	Alcorn State
DE	Phil Wells	UC Davis
DT	John Bushong	Western Kentucky
DT	Joe Ingersoll	UNLV
MG	Alan Klein	Southeastern Louisiana
LB	Jerry Janik	Texas A&I
LB	Art Thomas	Wittenberg
LB	Pete Yorkoski	Santa Clara
DB	Ralph Gebhardt	Rochester
DB	Tony Parisi	Wagner
DB	Ed Pinkham	Allegheny

== Third team ==
Position	Player	Team
Offense
QB	Lynn Heiber	IUP
RB	Tim Barrett	John Carroll
RB	Nate Beasley	Delaware
RB	Charles McDaniel	Louisiana Tech
WR	Ron Gustafson	North Dakota
TE	Duane Spale	Midland (NE)
T	James Files	McNeese State
T	Larry McFarland	Texas A&I
G	Coy Gibson	Wofford
G	Allen Haigler	Tennessee State
C	Bob McAndrews	North Park
Defense
DE	Elois Grooms	Tennessee Tech
DE	Sam Miller	Delaware
DT	Bill Chandler	Northwood
DT	Dave Nygaard	Linfield
MG	Bennie Barbour	Winston-Salem State
LB	Nick Buehler	UC Riverside
LB	Tom Kozlosky	East Stroudsburg
LB	Ron Rosenberg	Montana
DB	Anthony Leonard	Virginia Union
DB	Granville Lyons	Tennessee State
DB	Glen Printers	Southern Colorado

== See also ==
- 1974 College Football All-America Team
