= Roland Harper =

American football player (born 1953)

No. 35
- Position: Fullback

Personal information
- Born: February 28, 1953 (age 73); Seguin, Texas, U.S.
- Listed height: 5 ft 11 in (1.80 m)
- Listed weight: 208 lb (94 kg)

Career information
- High school: Captain Shreve (Shreveport, Louisiana)
- College: Louisiana Tech
- NFL draft: 1975: 17th round, 420th overall pick

Career history
- Chicago Bears (1975–1982)

Career NFL statistics
- Rushing attempts: 757
- Rushing yards: 3,044
- Rushing TDs: 15
- Stats at Pro Football Reference

Roland Harper (born February 28, 1953) is an American former professional football player who was a fullback for eight seasons with the Chicago Bears of the National Football League (NFL). He played college football for the Louisiana Tech Bulldogs before being selected 420th overall in the 17th and final round of the 1975 NFL draft. He was a starting fullback known in his playing days as a punishing blocker who opened holes in opposing defenses for star halfback Walter Payton. Harper ranks sixth on the Bears' all-time rushing list with 3,044 yards and 15 TDs on 757 carries in seven seasons. Harper was inducted into the Louisiana Tech University Athletic Hall of Fame in 1986.

Although he was selected in the final round of the 1975 draft, Harper wound up as the Bears starting fullback that season. He was joined in the backfield that season by fellow rookie Payton, who was the Bears first round draft choice that season. Fellow rookie Bob Avellini, the Bears sixth round draft pick in 1975, also started several games at quarterback that season, giving the Bears an all rookie backfield. Harper, Payton and Avelleni started most of the games for the Bears together from 1976 through 1978. In his rookie season, Harper rushed for 453 yards on 100 carries. His 4.5 yards per rushing attempt ranked 7th in the NFL that season. He also caught 27 passes for 191 yards in 1975.

In 1976, Harper started all 14 games and increased his rushing yards total to 625 on 147 carries, for a 4.3 yards per carry average. He also caught 29 passes for 291 yards. In 1977, Harper rushed for 457 yards on 120 carries, a 3.8 yards per carry average, and caught 19 passes for 142 yards.

Harper's best season was 1978, when he rushed for 992 yards on 240 carries, for a 4.1 yards per carry average. Since Payton rushed for 1,395 yards that season, he fell just eight rushing yards short of making the 1978 Bears the 3rd NFL team and 1st NFC team to have two players with at least 1,000 rushing yards (after the 1972 Miami Dolphins and the 1976 Pittsburgh Steelers). He also caught a career-high 43 passes that season for 340 yards, and set another career high by scoring eight touchdowns (six rushing, two receiving). His 1332 total yards from scrimmage ranked 10th in the NFL that season, and his 240 rushing attempts also ranked 10th in the NFL.

Harper missed the entire 1979 season due to a knee injury. However, he returned in 1980 and started 12 games. In 1980, he rushed for 404 yards on 113 carries for a 3.6 yards per carry average and caught just 7 passes for 31 yards, but his blocking helped Payton run for 1,460 yards. Although Harper played in 15 games in 1981, he was supplanted as the starting fullback for most of the season by Matt Suhey. He rushed for just 106 yards on 34 carries (a 3.1 average) and caught just two passes all year for ten yards. Harper's final season was 1982, when he played in eight games, rushed for seven yards on three carries, and caught one pass for eight yards.

After his playing career ended, Harper continued to live in the Chicago area. Since 1990, he ran Rohar Trucking and Excavating, a company that does snow removal, trucking, transporting construction materials and erecting steel. The company helped build the skyboxes at Soldier Field, the Bears' home field.

In June 2008, Harper pleaded guilty to one count of mail fraud. The fraud allowed Monahan Landscape Co.. a white-owned firm, to receive a $1.5 million Chicago Public Schools landscaping contract that was supposed to be reserved for minority-owned firms. The plea also revealed that Rohar was controlled by Monahan. In June 2009 he was sentenced to two years probation, including one year house arrest.

== NFL career statistics ==
Legend
**Bold**	Career high

=== Regular season ===
Year	Team	Games		Rushing					Receiving				
Year	Team	GP	GS	Att	Yds	Avg	Lng	TD	Rec	Yds	Avg	Lng	TD
1975	CHI	13	10	100	453	**4.5**	**32**	1	27	191	7.1	27	0
1976	CHI	14	14	147	625	4.3	28	2	29	291	**10.0**	**39**	1
1977	CHI	11	10	120	457	3.8	19	0	19	142	7.5	34	0
1978	CHI	**16**	**16**	**240**	**992**	4.1	31	**6**	**43**	**340**	7.9	33	**2**
1980	CHI	12	12	113	404	3.6	13	5	7	31	4.4	16	0
1981	CHI	15	2	34	106	3.1	11	1	2	10	5.0	8	0
1982	CHI	8	0	3	7	2.3	8	0	1	8	8.0	8	0
		89	64	757	3,044	4.0	32	15	128	1,013	7.9	39	3

=== Playoffs ===
Year	Team	Games		Rushing					Receiving				
Year	Team	GP	GS	Att	Yds	Avg	Lng	TD	Rec	Yds	Avg	Lng	TD
1977	CHI	**1**	**1**	**5**	**11**	**2.2**	**6**	0	**1**	**6**	**6.0**	**6**	0
		1	1	5	11	2.2	6	0	1	6	6.0	6	0
