= Mike Phipps =

American football player (born 1947)

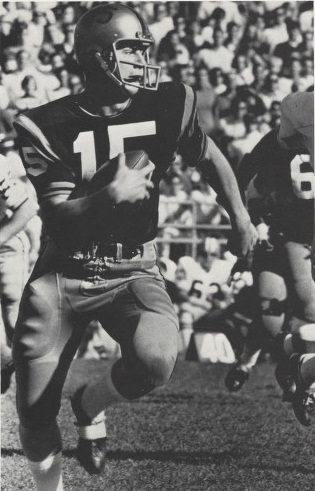
- Phipps from 1969 Purdue yearbook

No. 15
- Position: Quarterback

Personal information
- Born: January 9, 1947 (age 79); Shelbyville, Indiana, U.S.
- Listed height: 6 ft 3 in (1.91 m)
- Listed weight: 208 lb (94 kg)

Career information
- High school: Columbus North (Columbus, Indiana)
- College: Purdue
- NFL draft: 1970: 1st round, 3rd overall pick

Career history
- Cleveland Browns (1970–1976); Chicago Bears (1977–1981)

Awards and highlights
- Unanimous All-American (1969); Sammy Baugh Trophy (1969); Chicago Tribune Silver Football (1969); 2× First-team All-Big Ten (1967, 1969)

Career NFL statistics
- Passing attempts: 1,799
- Passing completions: 886
- Completion percentage: 49.2%
- TD–INT: 55–108
- Passing yards: 10,506
- Passer rating: 52.6
- Rushing yards: 1,278
- Rushing touchdowns: 13
- Stats at Pro Football Reference
- College Football Hall of Fame

Michael Elston Phipps (born November 19, 1947) is an American former professional football player who was a quarterback for 12 seasons in the National Football League (NFL) during the 1970s and 1980s. Phipps played college football for the Purdue Boilermakers, and was recognized as an All-American. He was the third overall pick in the 1970 NFL draft, and played professionally for the Cleveland Browns and Chicago Bears of the NFL.

== Early life ==
Phipps was born in Shelbyville, Indiana. He attended Columbus High School in Columbus, Indiana, and played for the Columbus Bulldogs high school football team.

== College career ==
Phipps attended Purdue University, where he played for the Purdue Boilermakers football team. He began his college career when he replaced All-American Boilermakers quarterback Bob Griese. His first major victory was a 28–21 upset of defending national champion Notre Dame Fighting Irish on September 30, 1967. Combining strong passing skills with excellent mobility helped Phipps establish a new school single-season record for total offense and earn the Boilermakers a share of the Big Ten Conference title.

The following year, Phipps suffered an ankle injury that kept him out of two games, and was overshadowed by teammate Leroy Keyes, a running back who spent all season in contention for the Heisman Trophy. The Boilermakers were the top-ranked team in the country until the Ohio State Buckeyes upset them 13–0 on October 12.

In 1969, Phipps became the focal point of Purdue's offense, throwing for five touchdowns in a 36–35 thriller over Stanford University on October 4, including throwing for a two-point conversion with three minutes left. He also defeated Notre Dame for the third consecutive year. Phipps finished second in the voting for the Heisman Trophy to Oklahoma Sooners running back Steve Owens. He was awarded the 1969 Sammy Baugh Trophy. Phipps declined a Rhodes Scholarship to concentrate on a professional football career.

== Professional career ==
Phipps was picked third overall in the first round of the 1970 NFL draft by the Cleveland Browns. The Browns traded All Pro wide receiver Paul Warfield to the Miami Dolphins for their first-round pick. Phipps saw limited action during his first two seasons. In the team's third game of the 1970 NFL season, Phipps came off the bench to lead a 15–7 comeback victory over the Pittsburgh Steelers. However, his lone start of the year would be a 14–10 loss to the Cincinnati Bengals on November 15, 1970, as the rookie finished with 529 passing yards on the season. The following year, Phipps threw for only 179 yards and started just one contest: a 13–7 defeat to the Kansas City Chiefs on November 14.

In 1972, Phipps again began the season on the sidelines, but became the team's starting quarterback after a disappointing 26–10 opening game loss to the Green Bay Packers on September 17. He threw for 13 touchdowns and nearly 2,000 yards, helping the Browns reach the NFL playoffs. In the November 13 game against the San Diego Chargers, he led a last-minute drive to win the 21–17 contest. In the team's playoff clash against the undefeated Miami Dolphins on December 24, Phipps had led the team to a 14–13 fourth quarter lead, but his five interceptions helped end hopes of a possible upset.

The following year, he threw for nine touchdowns, but was intercepted 20 times. Despite these struggles, he engineered two late-season comebacks in a win over the Steelers and a tie against the Kansas City Chiefs. However, the Browns missed the playoffs with a 7–5–2 record. In 1974, the team collapsed with a 4–10 record, and Phipps was briefly replaced by Brian Sipe at mid-season.

The 1975 season was even more disastrous as the Browns dropped their first nine games. However, Phipps went 23 of 36 in the team's first victory, a 35–23 win over the Cincinnati Bengals on November 23 in Cleveland. Phipps threw for a personal high of 298 yards with 2 TD passes and no interceptions. Two other victories helped give hope for a turnaround the following season.

In the team's 1976 opener against the New York Jets, Phipps started the game, but suffered a separated shoulder after being tackled by the Jets' Shafer Suggs. By the time he had recovered from the injury, Sipe had established himself as the team's new leader and Phipps' time in Cleveland was soon to come to an end.

That finish came on May 3, 1977, when Phipps was traded to the Bears for a first-round draft pick in 1978, which turned out to be Hall of Fame tight end Ozzie Newsome. He saw minimal action during the 1977 NFL season, threw for two touchdowns (along with 10 interceptions) the next year, but saw his most extensive action in 1979. During that year, he threw for 1,535 yards and nine touchdowns, as he battled teammates Bob Avellini and Vince Evans for playing time.

Phipps threw for a pair of touchdowns in each of the next two seasons, but his limited role and the arrival of both quarterback Jim McMahon in the 1982 NFL draft and new coach Mike Ditka resulted in his release.

Phipps was elected to the College Football Hall of Fame in 2006.

== NFL career statistics ==
Legend
	Led the league
**Bold**	Career high

=== Regular season ===
Year	Team	Games			Passing									Rushing					Sacks	
Year	Team	GP	GS	Record	Cmp	Att	Pct	Yds	Y/A	Lng	TD	Int	Rtg	Att	Yds	Avg	Lng	TD	Sck	Yds
1970	CLE	**14**	1	0–1	29	60	48.3	529	8.8	53	1	5	49.9	11	94	**8.5**	26	0	7	86
1971	CLE	**14**	1	0–1	13	47	27.7	179	3.8	39	1	4	14.6	6	35	5.8	15	0	0	0
1972	CLE	**14**	13	**10–3**	144	305	47.2	**1,994**	6.5	**80**	**13**	16	61.0	**60**	256	4.3	18	**5**	23	183
1973	CLE	**14**	**14**	7–5–2	148	299	49.5	1,719	5.7	51	9	**20**	49.4	**60**	**395**	6.6	**27**	**5**	**44**	**362**
1974	CLE	**14**	9	2–7	117	256	45.7	1,384	5.4	55	9	17	46.7	39	279	7.2	19	1	33	280
1975	CLE	**14**	11	3–8	**162**	**313**	51.8	1,749	5.6	48	4	19	47.5	18	70	3.9	12	0	28	261
1976	CLE	4	2	2–0	20	37	54.1	146	3.9	23	3	0	90.6	4	26	6.5	24	0	1	6
1977	CHI	3	0	0–0	3	5	60.0	5	1.0	10	0	0	64.6	0	0	0.0	0	0	3	26
1978	CHI	6	4	3–1	44	83	53.0	465	5.6	35	2	10	38.1	13	34	2.6	10	0	6	55
1979	CHI	12	10	9–1	134	255	52.5	1,535	6.0	68	9	8	69.6	27	51	1.9	12	0	15	145
1980	CHI	7	6	2–4	61	122	50.0	630	5.2	56	2	9	40.0	15	38	2.5	9	2	7	69
1981	CHI	3	0	0–0	11	17	**64.7**	171	**10.1**	43	2	0	**137.1**	1	0	0.0	0	0	5	41
Career		119	71	38–31–2	886	1,799	49.2	10,506	5.8	80	55	108	52.6	254	1,278	5.0	27	13	172	1,514

=== Playoffs ===
Year	Team	Games			Passing									Rushing					Sacks	
Year	Team	GP	GS	Record	Cmp	Att	Pct	Yds	Y/A	Lng	TD	Int	Rtg	Att	Yds	Avg	Lng	TD	Sck	Yds
1971	CLE	**1**	0	0–0	3	6	**50.0**	27	4.5	13	0	0	**62.5**	0	0	0.0	0	0	1	1
1972	CLE	**1**	**1**	0–1	9	23	39.1	131	**5.7**	27	**1**	**5**	33.3	**8**	**47**	**5.9**	**14**	**1**	**2**	**13**
1979	CHI	**1**	**1**	0–1	**13**	**30**	43.3	**142**	4.7	**31**	0	2	30.1	1	3	3.0	3	0	1	0
Career		3	2	0–2	25	59	42.4	300	5.1	31	1	7	24.6	9	50	5.6	14	1	4	14
