= Gerry Sullivan =

American football player (born 1952)

No. 79
- Positions: Tackle, center, guard

Personal information
- Born: January 15, 1952 (age 74); Oak Park, Illinois, U.S.
- Listed height: 6 ft 4 in (1.93 m)
- Listed weight: 250 lb (113 kg)

Career information
- High school: Oak Park and River Forest
- College: Illinois
- NFL draft: 1974: 7th round, 171st overall pick

Career history
- Cleveland Browns (1974–1981)

Career NFL statistics
- Games played: 119
- Games started: 26
- Stats at Pro Football Reference

Gerald B. Sullivan (born January 15, 1952) is an American former professional football player who was an offensive lineman for eight seasons with the Cleveland Browns of the National Football League (NFL). He played college football for the Illinois Fighting Illini.

In December 2012, Sullivan, along with former players Bruce Herron and Raymond Austin filed a lawsuit against the NFL for their handling of concussions.
