= Bob Avellini =

American football player (1953–2024)

No. 7
- Position: Quarterback

Personal information
- Born: August 28, 1953; New York City, New York, U.S.
- Died: May 4, 2024 (aged 70); Northborough, Massachusetts, U.S.
- Listed height: 6 ft 2 in (1.88 m)
- Listed weight: 208 lb (94 kg)

Career information
- High school: New Hyde Park Memorial (North New Hyde Park, New York)
- College: Maryland
- NFL draft: 1975: 6th round, 135th overall pick

Career history
- Chicago Bears (1975–1984); New York Jets (1984); Dallas Cowboys (1986)*
- * Offseason or practice squad member only

Career NFL statistics
- Passing attempts: 1,110
- Passing completions: 560
- Completion percentage: 50.5%
- TD–INT: 33–69
- Passing yards: 7,111
- Passer rating: 54.8
- Rushing yards: 225
- Rushing touchdowns: 5
- Stats at Pro Football Reference

Robert Hayden Avellini (August 28, 1953 – May 4, 2024) was an American professional football player who was a quarterback in the National Football League (NFL), primarily with the Chicago Bears. He played college football for the Maryland Terrapins and was selected by the Bears in the sixth round of the 1975 NFL draft. He finished his career with the New York Jets, for whom he did not appear in a game.

== Professional career ==
Avellini played college football at the University of Maryland and was a sixth round selection of the Bears in the 1975 NFL draft. As a rookie with Chicago in 1975, he started four games on a team that finished 4–10, throwing for 942 yards with 6 touchdown passes along with 11 interceptions.

He played for the Bears from 1975 to 1984, primarily serving as a backup quarterback during his NFL career. Fully established as the Bears starter in 1976, Avellini started all 14 games, throwing for 1,580 yards, although with 15 interceptions to only 8 touchdowns. Chicago improved to a 7–7 mark. Avellini improved those numbers in 1977, passing for 2,004 yards while once again starting every game for the Bears. His interception rate was rather high, throwing 18 picks compared to only 11 touchdown passes. The Bears showed improvement as they tied the Minnesota Vikings for the NFC Central title at 9–5 and earned a trip to the playoffs as the wildcard team, where they were handily beaten by the Dallas Cowboys. Walter Payton's season of over 1,800 yards rushing had much to do with their success.

In 1978, the Bears struggled. They started 4–8 with Avellini under center, as he threw for 16 interceptions, while tossing only 5 touchdown passes. This caused coach Neill Armstrong to make a switch at quarterback, inserting veteran Mike Phipps into the starting role. Phipps, for whom the Bears had traded their first-round pick in the 1978 draft to acquire from the Cleveland Browns, won 3 out of the final 4 games, to establish himself as the starter for the next season. The Bears surprisingly rolled to a 10–6 record in 1979, tying the record of the division champion Tampa Bay Buccaneers, and Avellini was now the backup. He continued in this capacity, playing behind Phipps, Vince Evans, and Jim McMahon until the 1984 season, seeing little action on the field.

In 1984, with the Bears starting 2–0, Jim McMahon was injured and Mike Ditka inserted Avellini as the starter for a road game against the Green Bay Packers. Avellini had started only five games since the end of the 1978 season. The Bears mustered little offense with Avellini at the controls, but still managed to edge the Packers 9–7. Chicago struggled the next week as they were soundly beaten by the Seattle Seahawks 38–9. This resulted in Avellini being cut from the Bears' roster by Ditka, ending his decade-long tenure with Chicago. Avellini signed with the New York Jets in mid-November, where he ended his playing career after the 1984 season. The Jets released him before the 1985 season. The Bears, meanwhile, went to the NFC Championship game in 1984 and won Super Bowl XX in 1985. Avellini made a brief comeback in 1986 with the Dallas Cowboys, starting three preseason games, but was released at the final cut deadline.

== Legal troubles ==
In May 2009, Avellini was arrested for driving under the influence and acquitted for the third time. He had been convicted of the offense in 2002. In October 2013, a DuPage County grand jury indicted Avellini on felony drunken driving charges a week after his sixth DUI-related arrest since 2002. On November 19, 2014, Avellini was sentenced to 18 months in prison for his 3rd DUI. Avellini declared bankruptcy on February 27, 2012, listing debts of more than $2.2 million and assets of $1.3 million.

== Personal life and death ==
Avellini was actively involved in a number of Chicago area charitable organizations. Along with a real estate career, he appeared on several Chicago radio and television sports shows.

Avellini died from pancreatic cancer on May 4, 2024, at the age of 70.
