= Bob Fisher (tight end) =

American football player (born 1958)

No. 85
- Position: Tight end

Personal information
- Born: March 17, 1958 (age 68); Pasadena, California, U.S.
- Listed height: 6 ft 0 in (1.83 m)
- Listed weight: 197 lb (89 kg)

Career information
- High school: Blair (Pasadena)
- College: SMU
- NFL draft: 1980: 12th round, 323rd overall pick

Career history
- Chicago Bears (1980–1981); New England Patriots (1983)*; Chicago Blitz (1984)
- * Offseason or practice squad member only

Career NFL statistics
- Receptions: 12
- Receiving yards: 203
- Receiving touchdowns: 2
- Stats at Pro Football Reference

Robert Lee Fisher (born June 20, 1958 – February 13, 2025) was an American professional football player who was a tight end in the National Football League (NFL) for the Chicago Bears of the National Football League (NFL) from 1980 to 1981. He played college football for the SMU Mustangs.

Following his retirement, Fisher spent time as a volunteer coach at Munster High School and worked as an advertising account executive. Death Fisher died on February 13, 2025, at the age of 66. At the time of his passing, he was a resident of Crown Point, Indiana. Following his football career, he was remembered as a dedicated coach and mentor to young athletes.
