= Jerry Meyers (American football) =

American football player (1954-2007)

No. 74, 79
- Position: Defensive tackle

Personal information
- Born: February 21, 1954; Chicago, Illinois, U.S.
- Died: November 16, 2007 (aged 53); Chicago, Illinois, U.S.
- Listed height: 6 ft 4 in (1.93 m)
- Listed weight: 249 lb (113 kg)

Career information
- High school: Lake View
- College: Northern Illinois
- NFL draft: 1976: 15th round, 411th overall pick

Career history
- Chicago Bears (1976–1979); Kansas City Chiefs (1980); Chicago Blitz (1983)*
- * Offseason or practice squad member only

Career NFL statistics
- Sacks: 5.5
- Fumble recoveries: 1
- Stats at Pro Football Reference

Jerry Edward Meyers (February 21, 1954 – November 16, 2007) was an American professional football defensive tackle who played for the Chicago Bears and the Kansas City Chiefs of the National Football League (NFL). He played college football at Northern Illinois University.

Meyers grew up in Chicago, Illinois, and attended Lake View High School where he was selected all-division in 1970. He played college football for the Northern Illinois Huskies and was a three-year letterman, being a team captain as a senior and ending his college career with 269 tackles. He was later inducted into the Northern Illinois Hall of Fame and was chosen to the school's All-Century team in 2000.

Meyers, selected by his hometown Chicago Bears in the 15th round of the 1976 NFL draft, survived being released numerous times to play four seasons and 47 games with the team. He recorded one fumble recovery and unofficially made 5.5 sacks with the Bears, later playing two games with the Kansas City Chiefs in 1980 before retiring. He had a brief stint with the Chicago Blitz of the United States Football League (USFL) in 1983 but did not appear in any games.

Meyers died on November 16, 2007, at the age of 53.
