= Dave Becker =

American football player (born 1957)

No. 49
- Position: Defensive back

Personal information
- Born: January 15, 1957 (age 69); Atlantic, Iowa, U.S.
- Listed height: 6 ft 2 in (1.88 m)
- Listed weight: 190 lb (86 kg)

Career information
- High school: Atlantic
- College: Iowa
- NFL draft: 1979: 11th round, 312th overall pick

Career history
- Chicago Bears (1979)*; Atlanta Falcons (1980)*; Chicago Bears (1980)
- * Offseason or practice squad member only
- Stats at Pro Football Reference

David Paul Becker (born January 15, 1957) is an American former professional football defensive back who played for the Chicago Bears in the National Football League (NFL). He played college football at University of Iowa.
