= Neill Armstrong =

American gridiron football player and coach (1926–2016)

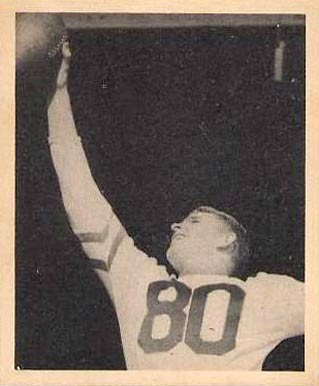
- Armstrong on 1948 Bowman football card

No. 80, 76, 77
- Positions: End, defensive back

Personal information
- Born: March 9, 1926; Tishomingo, Oklahoma, U.S.
- Died: August 10, 2016 (aged 90); Trophy Club, Texas, U.S.
- Listed height: 6 ft 2 in (1.88 m)
- Listed weight: 189 lb (86 kg)

Career information
- High school: Tishomingo
- College: Oklahoma A&M (1943-1946)
- NFL draft: 1947: 1st round, 8th overall pick

Career history

Playing
- Philadelphia Eagles (1947–1951); Winnipeg Blue Bombers (1951, 1953–1954)

Coaching
- Houston Oilers (1962–1963) Assistant coach; Edmonton Eskimos (1964–1969) Head coach; Minnesota Vikings (1970–1977) Assistant coach; Chicago Bears (1978–1981) Head coach; Dallas Cowboys (1982–1989) Assistant coach

Awards and highlights
- 2× NFL champion (1948, 1949); Third-team All-American (1945)

Career NFL statistics
- Receptions: 76
- Receiving yards: 961
- Receiving touchdowns: 11
- Stats at Pro Football Reference

Head coaching record
- Regular season: NFL: 30–34 (.469); CFL: 37–56–3 (.401)
- Postseason: NFL: 0–1 (.000); CFL: 0–3 (.000)
- Career: NFL: 30–35 (.462); CFL: 37–59–3 (.389)
- Coaching profile at Pro Football Reference

Neill Ford Armstrong (March 9, 1926 – August 10, 2016) was an American professional football player and coach whose career spanned more than four decades at both the college and professional levels. Notably, Armstrong served as the head coach of the Edmonton Eskimos of the Canadian Football League (CFL) and the Chicago Bears of the National Football League (NFL). Member of the 1945 National Championship Oklahoma A&M Team.

== Playing career ==
Armstrong played college football at Oklahoma A & M from 1943 to 1946, and was chosen in the first round (eighth overall) of the 1947 NFL draft by the Philadelphia Eagles. Playing both at end and defensive back, he helped the team capture the NFL championship in both 1948 and 1949. Armstrong concluded his playing career in the early 1950s playing for the CFL's Winnipeg Blue Bombers.

== Coaching career ==
In 1962, Armstrong's professional coaching career began when he was hired as an assistant coach with the Houston Oilers of the up-start American Football League (AFL). After serving two years in that capacity, he shifted back to Canada as head coach of the Edmonton Eskimos. In his six years, the team reached the postseason three times.

Armstrong was hired as an assistant with the Minnesota Vikings in 1970, and became an integral part of developing the team's dominating defense. After helping the team reach the postseason in all but one of the next eight years, he was hired as head coach of the Chicago Bears on February 16, 1978. In four years at the helm of the Bears, he was only able to compile a record of 30–35, with one playoff appearance in 1979. He was fired on January 3, 1982, but hired less than two months later as an assistant with the Dallas Cowboys. He spent the next eight seasons with the team before announcing his retirement on February 22, 1990. He and Bud Grant hold the distinction of being the only two people to have both played and been a head coach in both the NFL and CFL. He died in Trophy Club, Texas in 2016.

== Head coaching record ==
=== NFL ===
Team	Year	Regular season					Postseason			
Team	Year	Won	Lost	Ties	Win %	Finish	Won	Lost	Win %	Result
CHI	1978	7	9	0	.438	4th in NFC Central	–	–	–	–
CHI	1979	10	6	0	.625	2nd in NFC Central	0	1	.000	Lost to Philadelphia Eagles in NFC Wild-Card Game.
CHI	1980	7	9	0	.438	3rd in NFC Central	–	–	–	–
CHI	1981	6	10	0	.375	5th in NFC Central	–	–	–	–
CHI total		30	34	0	.469		0	1	.000	–
Total		30	34	0	.469		0	1	.000	–

== See also ==
- List of NCAA major college football yearly receiving leaders
