= Rocco Moore =

American football player (1955–2007)

No. 71
- Position: Guard

Personal information
- Born: March 31, 1955; Charlotte, Michigan, U.S.
- Died: December 21, 2007 (aged 52); Charlotte, Michigan, U.S.
- Listed height: 6 ft 7 in (2.01 m)
- Listed weight: 276 lb (125 kg)

Career information
- High school: Charlotte
- College: Western Michigan University
- NFL draft: 1977: 11th round, 283rd overall pick

Career history
- Philadelphia Eagles (1977); Chicago Bears (1980)
- Stats at Pro Football Reference

Rocco Ray Moore (March 31, 1955 - December 21, 2007) was an American professional football guard in the National Football League (NFL).

Moore was born March 31, 1955, in Charlotte, Michigan. He was an outstanding basketball and football player at Charlotte High School, and went on to play offensive tackle for Western Michigan University, where he was named First-team All-Mid-American Conference in 1976, and received four letters. He was drafted in the 11th round to play as a guard in 1977 by the Philadelphia Eagles, and in 1980 signed with the Chicago Bears, where he played seven games.

After leaving the Bears, he returned to Charlotte to become a mortgage broker. He died in 2007 at the age of 52, apparently from a heart attack.

In 2005, he was included in the Western Michigan University All Century Football team.
