= Lionel Antoine =

American football player (1950–2021)

No. 79
- Position: Offensive tackle

Personal information
- Born: August 31, 1950; Biloxi, Mississippi, U.S.
- Died: December 7, 2021 (aged 71); Biloxi, Mississippi, U.S.
- Listed height: 6 ft 6 in (1.98 m)
- Listed weight: 262 lb (119 kg)

Career information
- High school: M. F. Nichols (Biloxi, MS)
- College: Southern Illinois
- NFL draft: 1972: 1st round, 3rd overall pick

Career history
- Chicago Bears (1972–1979)

Awards and highlights
- First-team Little All-American (1971)

Career NFL statistics
- Games played: 68
- Games started: 39
- Fumble recoveries: 1
- Stats at Pro Football Reference

Lionel Sylvester Antoine (/ˈæntwɑːn/ AN-twahn; August 31, 1950 – December 7, 2021) was an American professional football player who was an offensive tackle for the Chicago Bears in the National Football League (NFL). He played college football at Southern Illinois University.

He was selected by the Bears in the first round with the third overall pick in the 1972 NFL draft. He played seven seasons in the NFL before a knee injury ended his career. He died on December 7, 2021, at the age of 71.
