= Walter Payton =

American football player (1953–1999)

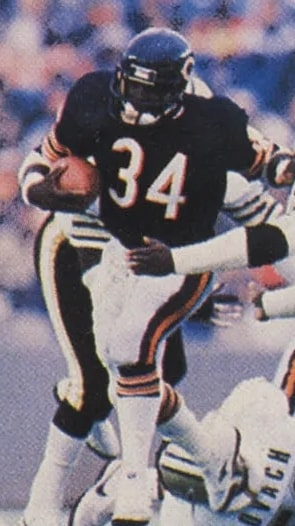
- Payton playing for the Chicago Bears in 1984

No. 34
- Position: Running back

Personal information
- Born: July 25, 1953 (Note: Although most sources at the time of his death gave Payton's birth year as 1954, reliable sources subsequently state he was born in 1953.); Columbia, Mississippi, U.S.
- Died: November 1, 1999 (aged 46); South Barrington, Illinois, U.S.
- Listed height: 5 ft 10 in (1.78 m)
- Listed weight: 200 lb (91 kg)

Career information
- High school: Columbia
- College: Jackson State (1971–1974)
- NFL draft: 1975: 1st round, 4th overall pick

Career history
- Chicago Bears (1975–1987)

Awards and highlights
- Super Bowl champion (XX); NFL Most Valuable Player (1977); NFL Offensive Player of the Year (1977); NFL Man of the Year (1977); 5× First-team All-Pro (1976, 1977, 1980, 1984, 1985); 3× Second-team All-Pro (1978, 1979, 1986); 9× Pro Bowl (1976–1980, 1983–1986); NFL rushing yards leader (1977); NFL rushing touchdowns leader (1977); Bert Bell Award (1985); NFL 1970s All-Decade Team; NFL 1980s All-Decade Team; NFL 75th Anniversary All-Time Team; NFL 100th Anniversary All-Time Team; Chicago Bears No. 34 retired; 100 greatest Bears of All-Time; First-team Little All-American (1974); Second-team Little All-American (1973); 3× First-team All-SWAC (1972–1974); NFL record: Most consecutive starts by a running back: 170 (Note: 178 including playoffs)

Career NFL statistics
- Rushing yards: 16,726
- Rushing average: 4.4
- Rushing touchdowns: 110
- Receptions: 492
- Receiving yards: 4,538
- Receiving touchdowns: 15
- Stats at Pro Football Reference
- Pro Football Hall of Fame
- College Football Hall of Fame

Walter Jerry Payton (July 25, 1953 – November 1, 1999) was an American professional football running back who played in the National Football League (NFL) for 13 seasons with the Chicago Bears. Nicknamed "Sweetness", he is widely regarded as one of the greatest football players of all time.

Payton began his football career in Mississippi and went on to have an outstanding college football career at Jackson State University playing for the Tigers, where he was named Little All-American twice. He started his professional career with the Chicago Bears in 1975, who selected him with the 1975 draft's fourth overall pick. Payton proceeded to win the 1977 AP NFL Most Valuable Player Award and won Super Bowl XX with the 1985 Chicago Bears. He retired from football at the end of the 1987 season having rushed for at least 1,200 yards in 10 of his 13 seasons in the NFL (with two of those thirteen being lockout-shortened seasons).

A nine-time Pro Bowl selection, Payton is remembered as a prolific rusher. He has held NFL records for career rushing yards, touchdowns, carries, yards from scrimmage, all-purpose yards, and many other categories. Payton also retired with the most receptions by a non-receiver, and he threw eight career touchdown passes. Payton was elected to the Pro Football Hall of Fame in 1993, to the Mississippi Sports Hall of Fame that same year, and to the College Football Hall of Fame in 1996. He was named to the NFL 75th Anniversary All-Time Team in 1994 and the NFL 100th Anniversary All-Time Team in 2019.

After struggling with the rare liver disease primary sclerosing cholangitis for several months, Payton died on November 1, 1999, from cholangiocarcinoma at the age of 46. His legacy includes being the eponym of the Walter Payton Man of the Year Award and the Walter Payton Award, as well as a heightened awareness of the need for organ donations.

== Early life ==
Payton was one of three children born to Edward Peter "Pete" Payton (1924–1978) and Alyne Payton (1926–2013) in Columbia, Mississippi. Payton's year of birth is disputed; most sources at the time of his death stated he was born in 1954. However, other sources have stated he was born in 1953. His father was a factory worker who had played semi-professional baseball; he died in jail in 1978 just a couple of hours after being wrongfully accused of driving under the influence due to a stroke that presented symptoms similar to alcohol intoxication.

Payton was an active member of the Boy Scouts, Little League, and his local church. At John J. Jefferson High School, Payton played drums in the marching band, participated in the track team and sang in the school choir. Outside of school, he played drums in jazz-rock groups.

His brother Eddie was on the football team, but Payton did not play—partly to avoid competing with him. After Eddie graduated, the football coach asked Payton to try out for the team, and he agreed on the condition that he be allowed to continue playing in the band.

Once he began to play football, as a junior, he achieved instant success as a running back, running 65 yards for a touchdown on his first high-school carry. At 5 ft 10 in (1.78 m), he was not especially large, but his speed and strength made him one of the team's featured players. John J. Jefferson High School was integrated with neighboring Columbia High School that year; Payton and his teammates were upset that their head coach, Charles L. Boston, had become an assistant and Payton boycotted some of the spring practices in protest, but returned during the fall season. He then earned statewide honors as a member of Mississippi's all-state team, leading Columbia to an unexpected 8–2 season. His performance helped ease the local tensions surrounding desegregation.

Tommy Davis, Columbia's football coach, claimed that he could always count on Payton when the team needed to score. Payton's statistics proved that was no exaggeration: he scored in every game during his junior and senior years. He was named to the all-conference team two years in a row. Payton also led the Little Dixie Conference in scoring his senior year and made the all-state team. In addition to excelling at football, Payton averaged 18 points a game for Columbia's basketball team, leaped three-quarters of an inch short of 23 feet in the long jump, played baseball, and continued to drum in the school band.

== College career ==
Even though Payton had established himself as one of Mississippi's best running back prospects, he received no invitations from Southeastern Conference colleges. After originally committing to Kansas State University, he decided to pursue his collegiate career at the historically black school and NAIA program, Jackson State University in Jackson, Mississippi, where his older brother Eddie played football.

While attending Jackson State, Payton played alongside many future professional football players, including his roommate, Rickey Young, as well as Jerome Barkum, Robert Brazile, and Jackie Slater. As a member of the Jackson State Tigers, Payton rushed for 3,600 yards, averaging 6.1 yards per carry, and set the school record for career rushing touchdowns with 65. (Note: 65 rushing touchdowns is not an official NCAA record, as individual scoring records are not officially recognized.) In 1973, Payton had a school record 24 rushing touchdowns, and was named Black College Player of the Year. He won this award again in 1974, in addition to being selected for the All-American Team. Payton graduated in 1975 with a bachelor's degree in communications.

He acquired the nickname "Sweetness" in college. The nickname's origin is ambiguous: it is variously said to have stemmed from his personality, from his athletic grace, or as an ironic description of his aggressive playing style. Payton was inducted into the College Football Hall of Fame in 1996, and was posthumously inducted into the inaugural class of the Black College Football Hall of Fame in 2010.

=== Breakout performance ===
On September 23, 1972, during Payton's sophomore year, he set a then-best SWAC single-game scoring record by rushing for seven touchdowns (on runs of 6, 8, 2, 3, 1, 2, and 31 yards) and two 2-point conversions for 46 points as Jackson State beat Lane College, 72–0. He also set a school record with 279 rushing yards in the game. (Note: As of 2015, second only to William Arnold's 346, see Media Guide, p.57)

== Professional career ==
=== 1975–1982 ===
The Chicago Bears drafted Payton in the first round of the 1975 NFL draft as the fourth overall pick. Payton was assigned #21 by the team but switched to #34 before the season started. The Bears had endured several losing seasons after the retirement of the iconic Gale Sayers in 1972. Payton's first game was not particularly successful; he was held to zero net rushing yards on eight attempts. His best performance of the season was the final game against the New Orleans Saints, where he rushed for 134 yards on 20 carries. Payton finished the season with only 679 yards and seven touchdowns. However, Payton led the league in yards per kickoff return.

Payton was eager to improve his performance. During the 1976 season, Payton rushed for 1,390 yards and scored 13 touchdowns. After the season, he was selected to play in the 1977 Pro Bowl, where he was declared the Pro Bowl MVP. The next year, he rushed for 1,852 yards and scored 16 touchdowns, becoming the league's leading non-kicking scorer for the season. He earned numerous awards that season, including the Associated Press and Pro Football Writers of America's Most Valuable Player awards. A memorable game of the 1977 season was against the Minnesota Vikings on November 20. He rushed for a then-record 275 yards, breaking the previous record of 273 yards held by O. J. Simpson. In that record-setting game against the Vikings, Payton was suffering with a 101-degree fever and intense flu. His longest run was for 58 yards, and he caught one pass for 6 yards. His record stood for 23 years until Corey Dillon of the Cincinnati Bengals ran for 278 yards on October 22, 2000 (Adrian Peterson of the Minnesota Vikings set the current record of 296 rushing yards in 2007). By the end of the decade, Payton had received additional accolades for his exploits as a blocker, receiver, emergency punter, and quarterback.

=== 1983–1986 ===
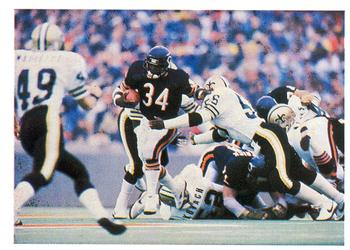
Payton (34) pictured breaking the NFL's career rushing record on October 7, 1984

The Bears struggled to assemble consecutive winning seasons, landing only two playoff berths since his arrival. The lack of success prompted the Bears' management to replace Neill Armstrong with Mike Ditka for the season that began in the Fall of 1982. Ditka, a tight end during the 1960s and 1970s who would also join the Pro Football Hall of Fame, led the Bears to a 3–6 (strike-shortened) record in 1982. He led the Bears to an 8–8 finish in 1983 and to a 10–6 finish in 1984. Payton continued his success by rushing for more than 1,400 yards in both seasons. On September 19, 1984, Payton passed Franco Harris as the active leader in career rushing yards. Three weeks later, on October 7, 1984, against the New Orleans Saints, Payton broke Jim Brown's career rushing record of 12,312 yards. In 1985, Payton rushed for more than 1,500 yards, helping the Bears establish the league's second-best offense with the emergence of quarterback Jim McMahon. The Bears' 46 defense of that season would go on to become one of the best in NFL history, setting a record for fewest points allowed. In one 1984 game, Payton was pressed into service as the team's fourth-string quarterback.

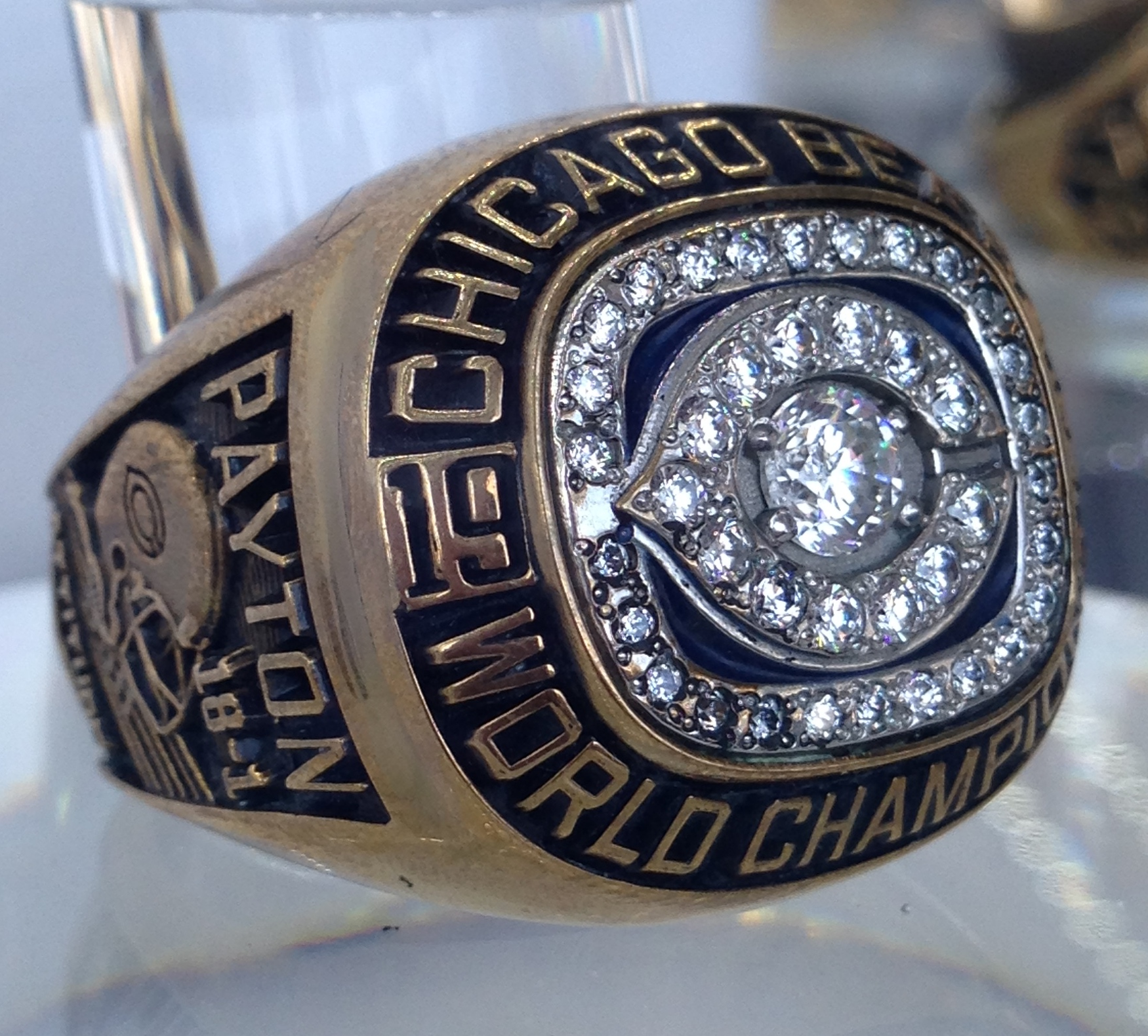
Payton's Super Bowl Ring (won in Super Bowl XX)

Payton performed with his teammates in the widely released 1985 music video The Super Bowl Shuffle. The Bears went on to a 15–1 record that culminated in a 46–10 victory over the New England Patriots in Super Bowl XX. Although Payton's offensive prowess had assisted the Bears throughout the 1985 season, he did not score any touchdowns in the postseason and the New England Patriots prevented him from reaching the end zone in the Super Bowl. According to quarterback Jim McMahon, he was targeted by two or three defenders on every play, and others stated that Payton's mere presence allowed others to shine, given that at least two people were targeting Payton on every play. In a later interview, Ditka stated that one of his major regrets was Payton's lack of a touchdown in the Super Bowl.

=== 1986–1987 ===
Payton, who was a 12-year veteran, amassed 1,333 yards in the 1986 season. The Bears won the NFC Central Division, but lost to the Washington Redskins 27–13 in the divisional round. At the end of the 1986 season, he announced that he would retire from professional football after completing the 1987 season. During his last season with the Bears, Payton split carries with his successor, Neal Anderson, and rushed for a career-low 533 yards along with four touchdowns. Payton's career ended with another loss to the Washington Redskins in the divisional round of the playoffs by the score of 21–17 on January 10, 1988. Over his entire career, Payton rushed for 16,726 yards, which broke the record for most rushing yards by any NFL player in history, and scored 110 touchdowns. He caught 492 passes for 4,538 yards and 15 touchdowns. Payton set several team records, including most career rushing yards, receptions, touchdowns, and touchdown passes by a running back. His jersey number was retired by the Bears, and he was inducted into the Pro Football Hall of Fame in 1993.

== Career statistics ==
=== NFL ===
Payton was the NFL's all-time leader in rushing yards and all-purpose yards prior to the 2002 NFL season when Emmitt Smith broke his record. Payton also held the rushing touchdown record until it was broken by Marcus Allen during the 1996 NFL season. He also held the single game rushing record until the 2000 NFL season, when it was broken by Corey Dillon. As of 2022, he is the NFL's second all-time leading rusher, and is ranked sixth in rushing touchdowns. Along with Frank Gifford, Payton threw six interceptions, more than any other non-quarterback position in NFL history. He also passed for eight touchdowns, which is second to Gifford (14) for non-quarterbacks.

Legend
| | AP NFL MVP & OPOTY |
| | Won the Super Bowl |
| | Led the league |
| **Bold** | Career high |

==== Regular season ====
| Year | Team | GP | Rushing | | | | | Receiving | | | | | All pps yds | Passing | |
| Year | Team | GP | Att | Yds | Avg | Lng | TD | Rec | Yds | Avg | Lng | TD | All pps yds | Yds | TD |
|---|---|---|---|---|---|---|---|---|---|---|---|---|---|---|---|
| 1975 | CHI | 13 | 196 | 679 | 3.5 | 54T | 7 | 33 | 213 | 6.5 | 40 | 0 | 892 | 0 | 0 |
| 1976 | CHI | 14 | 311 | 1,390 | 4.5 | 60 | 13 | 15 | 149 | 9.9 | 34 | 0 | 1,539 | 0 | 0 |
| 1977 | CHI | 14 | 339 | **1,852** | **5.5** | 73 | **14** | 27 | 269 | 10.0 | **75T** | 2 | **2,121** | 0 | 0 |
| 1978 | CHI | 16 | 333 | 1,395 | 4.2 | **76** | 11 | **50** | 480 | 9.6 | 61 | 0 | 1,875 | 0 | 0 |
| 1979 | CHI | 16 | 369 | 1,610 | 4.4 | 43T | **14** | 31 | 313 | 10.1 | 65T | 2 | 1,923 | 54 | 1 |
| 1980 | CHI | 16 | 317 | 1,460 | 4.6 | 69T | 6 | 46 | 367 | 8.0 | 54T | 1 | 1,827 | 0 | 0 |
| 1981 | CHI | 16 | 339 | 1,222 | 3.6 | 39 | 6 | 41 | 379 | 9.2 | 30 | 2 | 1,601 | 0 | 0 |
| 1982 | CHI | 9 | 148 | 596 | 4.0 | 26 | 1 | 32 | 311 | 9.7 | 40 | 0 | 907 | 39 | 1 |
| 1983 | CHI | 16 | 314 | 1,421 | 4.5 | 49T | 6 | 53 | **607** | **11.5** | 74T | 2 | 2,028 | 95 | **3** |
| 1984 | CHI | 16 | **381** | 1,684 | 4.4 | 72T | 11 | 45 | 368 | 8.2 | 31 | 0 | 2,052 | 47 | 2 |
| 1985 | CHI | 16 | 324 | 1,551 | 4.8 | 40T | 9 | 49 | 483 | 9.9 | 65 | 2 | 2,034 | **96** | 1 |
| 1986 | CHI | 16 | 321 | 1,333 | 4.2 | 41 | 8 | 37 | 382 | 10.3 | 57 | **3** | 1,715 | 0 | 0 |
| 1987 | CHI | 12 | 146 | 533 | 3.7 | 17 | 4 | 33 | 217 | 6.6 | 16 | 1 | 750 | 0 | 0 |
| Career | | 190 | 3,838* | 16,726* | 4.4 | 76 | 110* | 492 | 4,538 | 9.2 | 75 | 15 | 21,264* | 331 | 8 |

==== Postseason ====
| Year | Team | GP | Rushing | | | | | Receiving | | | | | All pps yds | Passing | |
| Year | Team | GP | Att | Yds | Avg | Lng | TD | Rec | Yds | Avg | Lng | TD | All pps yds | Yds | TD |
|---|---|---|---|---|---|---|---|---|---|---|---|---|---|---|---|
| 1977 | CHI | 1 | 19 | 60 | 3.2 | 11 | 0 | 3 | 33 | 11.0 | 20 | 0 | 93 | 0 | 0 |
| 1979 | CHI | 1 | 16 | 67 | 4.2 | 12 | **2** | 3 | **52** | **17.3** | **31** | 0 | 119 | 0 | 0 |
| 1984 | CHI | 2 | 46 | **196** | 4.3 | **20** | 0 | 4 | 23 | 5.8 | 12 | 0 | 219 | **19** | **1** |
| 1985 | CHI | 3 | **67** | 186 | 2.8 | 12 | 0 | **8** | **52** | 6.5 | 19 | 0 | **238** | 0 | 0 |
| 1986 | CHI | 1 | 14 | 38 | 2.7 | 9 | 0 | 1 | -2 | -2.0 | -2 | 0 | 36 | 0 | 0 |
| 1987 | CHI | 1 | 18 | 85 | **4.7** | 16 | 0 | 3 | 20 | 6.7 | 9 | 0 | 105 | 0 | 0 |
| Career | | 9 | 180 | 632 | 3.5 | 20 | 2 | 22 | 178 | 8.1 | 31 | 0 | 810 | 19 | 1 |

* NFL record at time of retirement

=== College ===
| Season | Team | Rushing | | | | Kicking | |
| Season | Team | Att | Yards | Avg | TD | XPM | FGM |
|---|---|---|---|---|---|---|---|
| 1971 | Jackson State | 94 | 652 | **6.9** | 5 | 13 | **3** |
| 1972 | Jackson State | 124 | 781 | 6.3 | 15 | **21** | 0 |
| 1973 | Jackson State | **205** | **1,139** | 5.6 | **24** | 13 | 2 |
| 1974 | Jackson State | 175 | 1,029 | 5.9 | 19 | 6 | 0 |
| Totals | | 598 | 3,600 | 6.0 | 63 | 53 | 5 |

== Career highlights ==
=== Awards and honors ===
- Super Bowl champion (XX)
- NFL Most Valuable Player (1977)
- NFL Offensive Player of the Year (1977)
- NFL Man of the Year (1977)
- 5× First-team All-Pro (1976, 1977, 1980, 1984, 1985)
- 3× Second-team All-Pro (1978, 1979, 1986)
- 9× Pro Bowl (1976–1980, 1983–1986)
- Pro Bowl MVP (1977)
- NFL rushing yards leader (1977)
- NFL rushing touchdowns leader (1977)
- Bert Bell Award (1985)
- NFL 1970s All-Decade Team
- NFL 1980s All-Decade Team
- NFL 75th Anniversary All-Time Team
- NFL 100th Anniversary All-Time Team
- No. 5 on The Top 100: NFL's Greatest Players
- Chicago Bears No. 34 retired
- 100 greatest Bears of All-Time
- Time All-American (1974)
- First-team Little All-American (1974)
- Second-team Little All-American (1973)
- 3× First-team All-SWAC (1972–1974)

=== Records ===
==== NFL records ====
- Consecutive regular season starts by a running back: 170, from December 7, 1975 to September 20, 1987
- Most consecutive seasons leading the league in rushing attempts: 4 (tied, 1976–1979)
- Games with 100 or more yards from scrimmage gained, career: 108
- Passing touchdowns by a non-quarterback since merger: 8

==== Bears franchise records ====
- Most rushing attempts (career): 3,838
- Most rushing attempts (season): 381 (1984)
- Most rushing attempts (game): 40 (1977-11-20 MIN)
- Most rushing attempts (playoff career): 180
- Most rushing attempts (playoff season): 67 (1985)
- Most rushing attempts (playoff game): 27 (1986-01-05 NYG; tied with Neal Anderson)
- Most rushing yards (career): 16,726
- Most rushing yards (season): 1,852 (1977)
- Most rushing yards (game): 275 (1977-11-20 MIN)
- Most rushing yards (playoff career): 632
- Most rushing TDs (career): 110
- Most rushing TDs (season): 14 (1977 and 1979; tied with Gale Sayers)
- Most rushing TDs (playoff game): 2 (1979-12-23 @PHI; tied with Thomas Jones twice)
- Most rushing yds/game (career): 88.0
- Most rushing yds/game (season): 132.3 (1977)
- Most receptions (career): 492
- Most receptions (playoff career): 22
- Most total TDs (career): 125
- Most yds from scrimmage (career): 21,264
- Most yds from scrimmage (season): 2,121 (1977)
- Most yds from scrimmage (playoff career): 810
- Most all purpose yds (career): 21,803
- Most all purpose yds (playoff career): 867
- Most 100+ yard rushing games (career): 78
- Most 100+ yard rushing games (season): 10 (1977, 1984 and 1985)
- Most games with 1+ TD scored (career): 89
- Most games with 2+ TD scored (career): 32
- Most games with 2+ TD scored (season): 6 (1977 and 1979)
- Most games with 3+ TD scored (career): 6
- Most games with 3+ TD scored (season): 2 (1977 and 1979; tied with Gale Sayers, Neal Anderson and Matt Forte)
- Most seasons with 1000+ rushing yards (career): 10

== Playing style ==
Payton's motto was "Never Die Easy", which is also the title of his posthumously published autobiography. Payton attributed this motto to Bob (Robert) Hill, his coach at Jackson State. In practice, this meant that Payton refused to deliberately run out-of-bounds and always delivered some punishment to his tacklers before being forced off the field or forced down.

One of Payton's signature maneuvers was the "stutter-step", a high-stepping, irregularly paced run. He developed this as a way to distract his pursuers during long runs, saying that it startled them into thinking and gave him some advantage over players who were actually faster runners. In his autobiography, he likened the stutter step to a kind of "option play": when he was stutter-stepping, defenders would have to commit to a pursuit angle based upon whether they thought he would accelerate after the stutter-step, or cut—he would read this angle and do the opposite of what the defender had committed to.

He re-invented the practice of stiff-arming his tacklers, which had gone out of favor among running backs in the 1970s. At times, he used his high-school experience as a long jumper to leap over his opponents, landing on his head in the end zone to gain a touchdown in a game against the Buffalo Bills. His running gait was somewhat unusual, as his knees were minimally bent, and the motion was largely powered from the hip. This may have given his knees, a football player's most vulnerable joints, some protection, although he underwent arthroscopic surgery on both knees in 1983. He referred to this procedure as an 11,000-yard checkup.

After scoring touchdowns, Payton declined to celebrate; instead, he would often hand the ball to his teammates or the official. He disapproved of the growing practice of touchdown celebrations; he preferred post-game antics such as rushing into the locker room and locking his teammates out in the cold while taking a long shower. Although Payton would have won the respect of his peers and coaches by his running alone, he retired as the career leader in receptions for a running back, with 492 for over 4,500 yards, (Note: See list for 1920–1987 (min. 1000 career rush attempts) at pro-football-reference.com) and still holds the career record for a running back, with 8 touchdown passes. (Note: See running backs with 4+ passing TDs at pro-football-reference.com (max. 200 pass attempts))

== Investments ==
In 1990, Payton, along with many other investors, sought to bring an NFL expansion team to St. Louis, Missouri, and Payton expressed his interest in becoming the first minority owner in NFL history. Although the NFL strongly favored a franchise in St. Louis, their efforts were thwarted because of internal dissension among the investment group members. leading the NFL to award franchises to investment groups in Jacksonville, Florida (Jacksonville Jaguars), and Charlotte, North Carolina (Carolina Panthers). St. Louis eventually received a team when the Los Angeles Rams moved to the city in 1995. In July 1999, Payton was part on an investment group that secured an expansion Arena Football League franchise in Chicago, later known as the Chicago Rush.

Payton pursued various business ventures in retirement, including becoming co-owner of Dale Coyne Racing in the CART IndyCar World Series. He also drove in several Trans-Am Series events, including a 1993 race at Road America in which his car overturned and caught fire. He suffered burns but escaped serious injury.

In 1993, Payton along with Mike Lanigan of Mi-Jack Products, co-founded Walter Payton Power Equipment, a midwest crane and heavy equipment distributor.

In 1995, he and several partners purchased a roundhouse in Aurora, Illinois that had previously belonged to the Chicago, Burlington and Quincy Railroad. The property became known as "Walter Payton's Roundhouse", hosting a restaurant, brewery, banquet and meeting facility, and museum. In 1999, the property received an award from the National Trust for Historic Preservation. The beers brewed at the Roundhouse received awards in the 2000s.

== In popular culture ==
Payton appeared on a 1987 episode of Saturday Night Live (co-hosting with fellow football player Joe Montana). That same year, he participated in Prince Edward of the United Kingdom's charity television special The Grand Knockout Tournament. In 1994, he made an appearance at the World Wrestling Federation's SummerSlam event in the corner of Razor Ramon.

== Personal life ==
Throughout his life, Payton had claimed his date of birth as July 25, 1954, a date that is cited in many of his early biographies. However, while researching his biography of Payton, Sports Illustrated's Jeff Pearlman discovered his actual date of birth to be July 25, 1953. Pearlman found Payton's earliest use of the later date during his pursuit of the Heisman Trophy at Jackson State.

Payton married Connie Norwood in 1976. During his rookie year, he resided in a home on the north side of Arlington Heights, Illinois. The couple had two children, Jarrett Payton (born 1980) and Brittney Payton (1985) and resided in South Barrington, Illinois. Payton's marriage of 18 years came to an abrupt end when he unexpectedly served Norwood divorce papers for joint custody. However, despite the fact that the couple mostly lived apart for the rest of Payton's life, the divorce was never made official.

In 1988, Payton accidentally shot a manager of a nightclub in Schaumburg, Illinois, that was owned by Payton. Payton had recently bought a 9 mm French-made Manurhin Pistolet for his collection and was unaware that it was loaded. The pistol, which was described as a collector's handgun that was registered, discharged while being handed to Payton by a third party while pointed at the nightclub manager, Elmer Ray Hutson Jr.; Hutson suffered knee damage from the shooting.

Payton battled with depression after his playing career. His agent, Bud Holmes, recalled Payton talked about committing suicide. His executive assistant, Ginny Quirk, also recounted a similar instance where Payton said, "You won't see me when you get to the office tomorrow. Enjoy life without me."

A Christian, Payton attended the non-denominational Destiny Church in Hoffman Estates, Illinois, in the years after retiring from football.

== Illness and death ==
In February 1999, Payton announced that he had a rare liver disease known as primary sclerosing cholangitis. He spent his final months as an advocate for organ transplants, appearing in many commercials to encourage others to donate organs. In April 1999, Payton made a final public appearance at a Chicago Cubs game with Mike Ditka and threw the game's ceremonial first pitch.

Author Don Yaeger worked with Payton during the last weeks of his life to write his autobiography, Never Die Easy.

On November 1, 1999, Payton died of bile duct cancer. He was 46 years old. During the week of his death, the NFL held special ceremonies in each game to commemorate his career and legacy. In addition, the Chicago Bears wore special #34 patches on their jerseys to honor Payton. The fact that Payton had cancer was not disclosed to the public until after his death.

Speakers at Payton's public funeral service, held in Soldier Field, included then National Football League Commissioner Paul Tagliabue; former teammate Dan Hampton; his widow, Connie Payton; and his children, Jarrett and Brittney. Among the 1,000 mourners at the private service were John Madden; Illinois Governor George Ryan; Chicago's mayor Richard M. Daley; former teammates Matt Suhey, Mike Singletary, Roland Harper, and Jim McMahon; and the Bears' equipment manager and building superintendent.

== Legacy ==
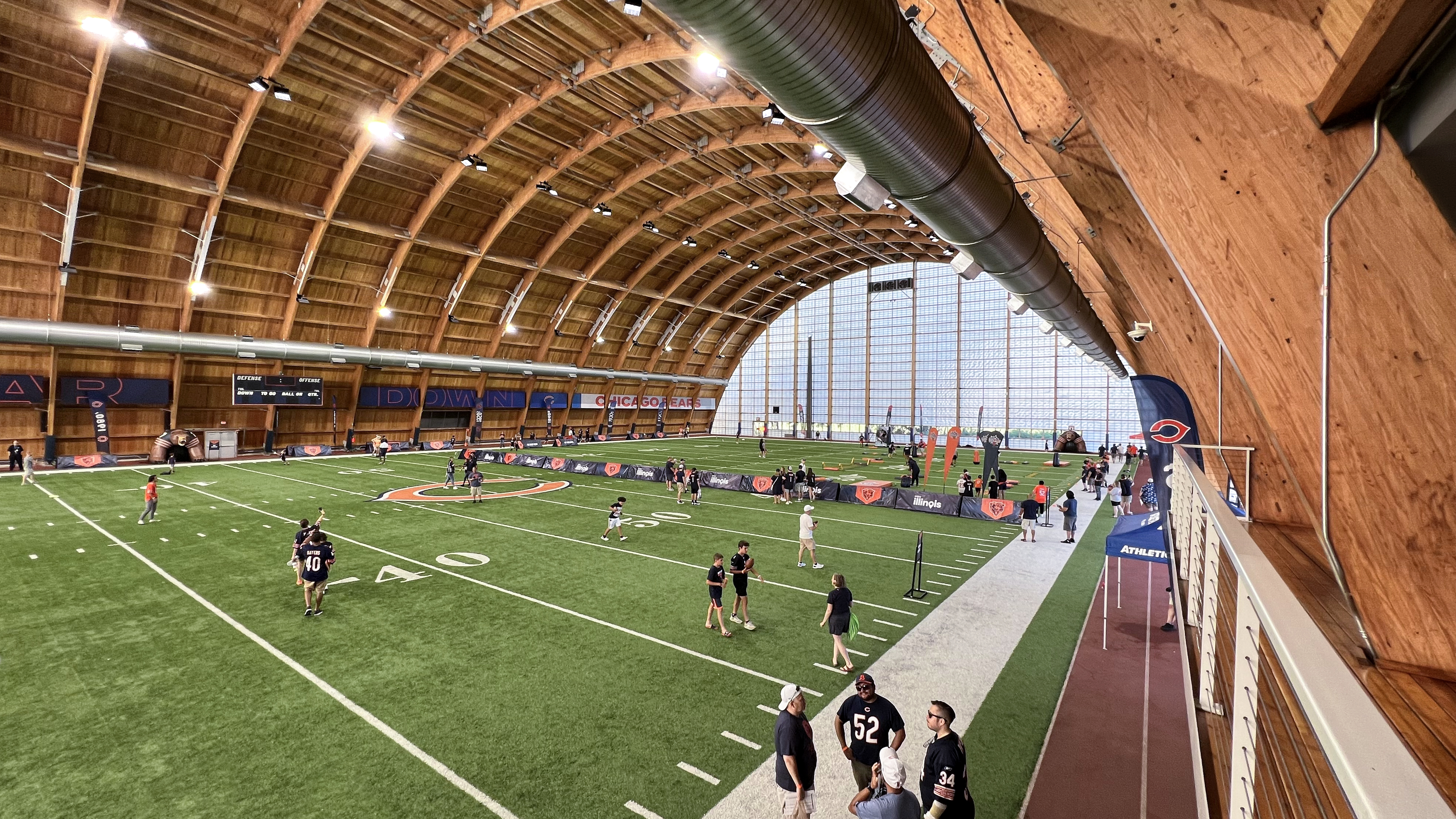
The Walter Payton Center at Halas Hall within the Chicago Bears HQ

Payton was inducted as a laureate of The Lincoln Academy of Illinois and awarded the Order of Lincoln by the governor of Illinois in 1987 in the area of sports. In 1988, he received the Golden Plate Award of the American Academy of Achievement.

Payton's legacy continued through the charitable Walter and Connie Payton Foundation. His own appeals—and, after his death, his foundation's—for greater awareness of the need for organ donations are widely credited with bringing national attention to the problem. After his appeals, donations in Illinois skyrocketed, and the regional organ bank of Illinois was overwhelmed with calls. In response, the City of Chicago inserted organ donation requests into city-vehicle-registration mailings in early 2000, and, by August 2000, 13,000 people had signed on to the program. The foundation continues to run a program that Payton organized to donate toys to underprivileged children across the Chicago area each Christmas. The family established the Walter Payton Cancer Fund in 2002.

Pro Football Focus founder Neil Hornsby in 2010 named Payton as the greatest player in NFL history. Many modern NFL running backs have cited Payton as a source of inspiration. Emmitt Smith tearfully paid homage to Payton after breaking Payton's rushing record. LaDainian Tomlinson, who set numerous records during the 2006 NFL season, named Payton as one of his foremost mentors and inspirations. Ahman Green, a former player for the Bears' rival Green Bay Packers, is said to have idolized Payton, viewing the highlight film "Pure Payton" before each game. Walter's son, Jarrett Payton, was a running back for the Tennessee Titans, NFL Europe's Amsterdam Admirals, CFL's Montreal Alouettes, and IFL's Chicago Slaughter. During his tenure at the University of Miami, Jarrett wore a #34 jersey to honor his father's memory. In 2009, Jarrett married on March 4 (3/4), which was intentionally set to coincide with Payton's jersey number.

The city of Chicago has honored Payton's memory in several ways. In 1999, the city created a special city sticker that featured Payton. The profits from the sales of these stickers along with the special license plate created by the State of Illinois are given to support organ-donor programs across Illinois. Also, the city named a magnet high school, Walter Payton College Prep, in his honor. In September 2007, the University of Illinois at Chicago Medical Center opened the Walter Payton Liver Center after a generous donation from Payton's family, who were pleased with the care he received there. Chicago Metra commuters have long been witness to a simple "#34 Sweetness", painted on a bridge piling of the Air Line on the south end of the Chicago Union Station yards. The State of Illinois has named U.S. Route 34 in Illinois as the Walter Payton Memorial Highway. A statue of Walter Payton accompanied by a plaque was dedicated in front of the south entrance to Soldier Field in 2019.

Until its sale to Two Brothers Brewing in 2011, Walter Payton's Roundhouse continued to draw hundreds of thousands of visitors annually to the Aurora, Illinois site. A plaque now hangs on the building commemorating Payton. There are two athletic awards named after Payton. The NCAA gives the "Walter Payton Award" to the best offensive player from a Division I FCS (still often known by its former designation of Division I-AA) football team. The NFL hands out the "Walter Payton Man of the Year" award for player achievements in community service during a particular season. The wellness center at Jackson State University is also named in honor of him, known as "The Walter Payton Recreation and Wellness Center."

The Chicago Bears honored Payton's career and life on November 1, 2009, by airing a special tribute video during halftime. The video consisted of highlight clips from Payton's career and interview segments from Mike Ditka, Virginia McCaskey, Richard Dent, and many other members of the Bears organization. Payton's wife, daughter, son, and mother were present to watch the video, which aired on Soldier Field's Jumbotron. The Bears later named their official indoor practice and training facility at Halas Hall in Lake Forest, Illinois after Payton.

After Payton's death, Nickol Knoll Hill, an old landfill site turned into a golf course in Arlington Heights, Illinois, was renamed "Payton's Hill". There are two plaques on the hill to remind visitors of the hill that it was where Payton used to train in the 1970s and 1980s. Payton did his morning run at the hill every day. Pictures and memorabilia of Payton cover the walls of the golf course clubhouse.

The asteroid 85386 Payton, discovered by the Air Force Maui Optical and Supercomputing observatory in 1996, is named in Payton's memory. The official naming citation was published by the Minor Planet Center on May 20, 2008 (M.P.C. 62930).

In September 2019, the Chicago Tribune named Payton the greatest Bears player of all time. In 2022, he was inducted into the National High School Hall of Fame.
