= Steve Schubert =

American football player (born 1951)

Steven Schubert
No. 87, 85
- Position: Wide receiver

Personal information
- Born: March 15, 1951 (age 75); Brooklyn, New York, U.S.
- Listed height: 5 ft 10 in (1.78 m)
- Listed weight: 185 lb (84 kg)

Career information
- High school: Manchester Central (NH)
- College: UMass
- NFL draft: 1973: undrafted

Career history
- San Diego Chargers (1973)*; New England Patriots (1974); Chicago Bears (1975–1979)
- * Offseason or practice squad member only

Career NFL statistics
- Receptions: 24
- Receiving yards: 362
- Total TDs: 4
- Stats at Pro Football Reference

Steven William Schubert (born March 15, 1951) is an American former professional football player who was a wide receiver six seasons in the National Football League (NFL) from 1974 to 1979. He played college football for the UMass Minutemen. He played in the NFL for the New England Patriots and Chicago Bears.

Schubert caught the only touchdown that the Bears scored in their 37–7 loss to the Dallas Cowboys in the 1977 NFC Divisional playoff game. It was the Bears' first postseason game in 14 years, since they won the 1963 NFL Championship Game in 1963 against the New York Giants.

== Early life and career ==
Schubert was born in Brooklyn, New York, to Charles Schubert Jr. and Alice Pappas.
