= Ron Rydalch =

American football player (born 1952)

No. 76
- Position: Defensive tackle

Personal information
- Born: January 1, 1952 (age 74); Tooele, Utah, U.S.
- Listed height: 6 ft 4 in (1.93 m)
- Listed weight: 260 lb (118 kg)

Career information
- High school: Tooele
- College: Utah
- NFL draft: 1974: 8th round, 197th overall pick

Career history
- Chicago Bears (1975–1980)

Awards and highlights
- WAC Lineman of the Year (1973)

Career NFL statistics
- Sacks: 18.5
- Fumble recoveries: 2
- Stats at Pro Football Reference

Ronald James Rydalch (born January 1, 1952) is an American former professional football player who was a defensive tackle for six seasons with the Chicago Bears of the National Football League (NFL). He played college football for the Utah Utes. Rydalch signing with the Houston Texans of the World Football League (WFL) before being picked up by the Bears during the 1975 season.
