= Terry Schmidt =

American football player (born 1952)

No. 40, 44
- Position: Cornerback

Personal information
- Born: May 28, 1952 (age 74); Columbus, Indiana, U.S.
- Listed height: 6 ft 0 in (1.83 m)
- Listed weight: 177 lb (80 kg)

Career information
- High school: Columbus North
- College: Ball State
- NFL draft: 1974: 5th round, 121st overall pick

Career history
- New Orleans Saints (1974–1975); Chicago Bears (1976–1984)

Awards and highlights
- PFWA All-Rookie Team (1974)

Career NFL statistics
- Interceptions: 26
- Fumble recoveries: 7
- Defensive TDs: 3
- Stats at Pro Football Reference

Terry Richard Schmidt (born May 28, 1952) is an American dentist and former American football player, playing cornerback in the National Football League (NFL) for the New Orleans Saints and Chicago Bears. He played college football at Ball State University where he was an All-American. In 2020, he was nominated to be part of the 2021 National Football Foundation College Football Hall of Fame Class.

After completing his football career, Schmidt attended Loyola University Dental School in Chicago, Illinois where he graduated first in his class in 1989. His entire professional dental career has been spent working in the Veterans Administration hospital system, first at the North Chicago VA Hospital where he was Chief of Dental Services for six years, later at the James A. Haley Veterans' Hospital in Tampa, Florida and the Charles George VA Medical Center in Asheville, North Carolina. Schmidt recently retired as chief of dental services at the James H Quillen VA Medical Center in Johnson City, TN/ He is also a retired commander in the United States Naval Reserve. Dr. Schmidt and his late wife, Nancy Chamberlain Schmidt, performed missionary dentistry in third world countries, most notably in Central and South America and in Africa until Mrs. Schmidt's untimely death from ovarian cancer in March 2018. Dr. Schmidt married the former Janetta Sue Whitesel, a nurse, on November 8, 2018. In retirement, both are anticipating continuing missionary work. Dr. Schmidt also serves on the medical board of the Christians for World-Wide Evangelism in Tampa, Florida. He is an adjunct faculty member in the Dental Assistant/Dental Hygenist program at the A.B Technical School in Asheville, NC.
