= Tom Hicks (American football) =

American football player (born 1952)

No. 54
- Position: Linebacker

Personal information
- Born: December 18, 1952 (age 73); Chicago, Illinois, U.S.
- Listed height: 6 ft 4 in (1.93 m)
- Listed weight: 235 lb (107 kg)

Career information
- High school: Willowbrook (IL)
- College: Illinois
- NFL draft: 1975: 6th round, 151st overall pick

Career history
- Chicago Bears (1976–1980)

Awards and highlights
- First-team All-Big Ten (1974); Second-team All-Big Ten (1973)

Career NFL statistics
- Games played-started: 64-28
- Interceptions: 5
- Touchdowns: 1
- Stats at Pro Football Reference

Thomas Logan Hicks (born December 18, 1952) is an American former professional football player who was a linebacker for five seasons with the Chicago Bears of the National Football League (NFL), from 1976 to 1980. His jersey number was 54.

During the 1978 NFL season, Hicks suffered a knee injury in Week 10 in a contest against the Seattle Seahawks. He was diagnosed with torn knee ligaments and underwent surgery that evening after the game. He missed the remainder of the 1978 NFL season.

After a breakdown in contract negotiations for the 1981 season, Hicks retired.

Hicks played college football for the Illinois Fighting Illini.

Hicks was an all-state linebacker at Willowbrook High School in Villa Park, IL (Class of 1971).
