= Bruce Herron =

American football player (born 1954)

No. 51
- Position: Linebacker

Personal information
- Born: April 14, 1954 (age 72); Victoria, Texas, U.S.
- Listed height: 6 ft 2 in (1.88 m)
- Listed weight: 220 lb (100 kg)

Career information
- College: New Mexico
- NFL draft: 1977: 7th round, 180th overall pick

Career history
- Miami Dolphins (1977)*; Chicago Bears (1978–1982)
- * Offseason or practice squad member only

Career NFL statistics
- Sacks: 3
- Fumble recoveries: 1
- Stats at Pro Football Reference

Bruce Wayne Herron (born April 14, 1954) is an American former professional football player who played linebacker for five seasons for the Chicago Bears of the National Football League (NFL). He was selected by the Miami Dolphins in the 7th round (180th overall) of the 1977 NFL Draft. In December 2012, Herron and former players Raymond Austin and Gerry Sullivan filed a lawsuit against the NFL over their handling of concussions.
