= Jim Osborne (defensive tackle) =

American football player (born 1949)

No. 68
- Position: Defensive tackle

Personal information
- Born: September 7, 1949 (age 77); Sylvania, Georgia, U.S.
- Listed height: 6 ft 3 in (1.91 m)
- Listed weight: 250 lb (113 kg)

Career information
- High school: Dillard (Fort Lauderdale, Florida)
- College: Southern
- NFL draft: 1972: 7th round, 182nd overall pick

Career history
- Chicago Bears (1972–1984)

Awards and highlights
- 100 greatest Bears of All-Time; Third-team Little All-American (1971)

Career NFL statistics
- Sacks: 81
- Fumble recoveries: 9
- Stats at Pro Football Reference

James Henry Osborne (born September 7, 1949) is an American former professional football player who was a defensive tackle for the Chicago Bears in the National Football League (NFL). He attended Southern University, and spent his entire 13-year pro career with Bears. Osborne retired in 1984, one year shy of the Bears Super Bowl win. At the time of his retirement he lived in Olympia Fields. He won the Brian Piccolo Award from the Bears organization in 1972.
