= Gary Campbell (linebacker) =

American football player (born 1952)

No. 59
- Position: Linebacker

Personal information
- Born: March 4, 1952 (age 74); Honolulu, Hawaii, U.S.
- Listed height: 6 ft 1 in (1.85 m)
- Listed weight: 218 lb (99 kg)

Career information
- High school: Saint Louis (Honolulu)
- College: Colorado
- NFL draft: 1976: 10th round, 291st overall pick

Career history
- Chicago Bears (1977–1983)

Awards and highlights
- First-team All-Big Eight (1975)

Career NFL statistics
- Sacks: 12
- Fumble recoveries: 9
- Interceptions: 4
- Stats at Pro Football Reference

Gary Kalani Campbell (born March 4, 1952) is an American former professional football player who was a linebacker for seven seasons with the Chicago Bears in the National Football League (NFL) from 1977 to 1983. He played college football for the Colorado Buffaloes and was selected by the Pittsburgh Steelers in the 10th round of the 1976 NFL draft with the 291st overall pick.
