= James Scott (gridiron football) =

American football player (born 1952)

No. 89
- Position: Wide receiver

Personal information
- Born: March 28, 1952 (age 74); Longview, Texas, U.S.
- Listed height: 6 ft 1 in (1.85 m)
- Listed weight: 190 lb (86 kg)

Career information
- High school: Gladewater (Gladewater, Texas)
- College: Trinity Valley CC
- NFL draft: 1975: 8th round, 193rd overall pick

Career history
- Chicago Fire (1974); Chicago Bears (1976–1980); Montreal Alouettes (1981); Chicago Bears (1982–1983)

Awards and highlights
- CFL All-Star (1981)

Career NFL statistics
- Receptions: 177
- Receiving yards: 3,202
- Receiving TDs: 20
- Stats at Pro Football Reference

Bernard James Scott (born March 28, 1952) is an American former professional football player who was a wide receiver for seven seasons with the Chicago Bears in the National Football League (NFL). He was selected 193rd overall in the eighth round by the New York Jets in the 1975 NFL draft.

In 1974, he played for the Chicago Fire of the World Football League (WFL), catching 52 passes for 755 yards and 8 touchdowns. He had his best pro season in 1981, for the Montreal Alouettes of the Canadian Football League (CFL), when he caught 81 passes for 1422 yards and 6 touchdowns and was a conference All-Star.

Scott is now living back in his home state of Texas, near Dallas.
