= Noah Jackson =

American football player (1951–2023)

Profile
- Position: Guard

Personal information
- Born: April 14, 1951; Jacksonville Beach, Florida, U.S.
- Died: November 20, 2023 (aged 72); Jacksonville, Florida, U.S.
- Listed height: 6 ft 2 in (1.88 m)
- Listed weight: 267 lb (121 kg)

Career information
- College: Tampa
- NFL draft: 1974: 7th round, 161st overall pick

Career history
- 1972–1974: Toronto Argonauts
- 1975–1983: Chicago Bears
- 1984: Tampa Bay Buccaneers

Awards and highlights
- CFL East All-Star (1974)
- Stats at Pro Football Reference

Noah Dale Jackson (April 14, 1951 – November 20, 2023) was an American professional football player who played offensive lineman for ten seasons between 1975 and 1984 for the Chicago Bears and Tampa Bay Buccaneers of the National Football League (NFL). He played a total of 131 games, starting 124 for the Bears, primarily at left guard, and three for the Buccaneers. He was named to the United Press International NFL All-Rookie Team in 1975 and was an All-NFL honorable mention selection by UPI in 1977 and 1978. Previously, he played three seasons for the Toronto Argonauts of the Canadian Football League (CFL), where he was an Eastern Division All-Star in 1974. Afterwards, he was traded by the Baltimore Colts to the Bears for a seventh-round draft pick in the 1975 NFL draft.

== Early life ==
Noah Dale Jackson was born in Jacksonville Beach, Florida, to Lottie James and George Jackson. He attended the Jacksonville Beach School for Colored Children, a segregated grammar school, from first through the eighth grade and Duncan U. Fletcher High School in Neptune Beach, Florida, from 1965-1969. He was voted a preseason All-American as a senior middle linebacker. As a sophomore in 1966, Jackson was the only African American on the 39-player Fletcher High varsity roster. In 1967, Jackson and Fletcher teammate Tom Sullivan, who went on to play six seasons for the Philadelphia Eagles, were the first African Americans named to The Jacksonville Journal’s All-County football team. Jackson also played basketball for three years in high school and was voted Homecoming King. In 1968, he was named Defensive Player of the Year by the Jacksonville Quarterback Club and was a member of the Florida Sportswriters Association Region 1-AA team.

== College career ==
Jackson played college football for three seasons with the University of Tampa Spartans football program, starting at defensive tackle for head coach Fran Curci in 1969 and 1970 and one season for head coach Bill Fulcher in 1971. The Spartans, who played as an independent, posted a 10–1 record in 1970 and finished the season as the fourth-ranked small college football team in the country. Jackson gave up his final year of college eligibility to sign a free-agent contract with Toronto Argonauts on March 8, 1972.

== Professional career ==
=== 1972–1974 ===
Jackson suited up for 44 games with the Argonauts, playing both left guard and left offensive tackle. He was selected by the Football Reporters of Canada to the 1974 Eastern Conference All-Star Team as a tackle. In 1974, Jackson was drafted by both the NFL’s Baltimore Colts and the Florida Blazers of the upstart World Football League. Jackson never signed with either team, preferring to play out his third-year option with the Argonauts, who finished 6–9–1 and failed to make to the 1974 CFL playoffs. During the Jan. 28, 1975, draft, the Bears traded their #5 pick in the 1976 draft to the Colts for the rights to Jackson and a seventh-round draft pick in 1976. Jackson officially signed with the Bears on March 25, 1975, after a brief tryout camp in Florida.

=== 1975–1984 ===
During his nine seasons with the Chicago Bears, Noah Jackson, who was nicknamed “Buddha,” helped pave the way for Walter Payton, who recorded seven 1,000-yard rushing seasons from 1975 to 1983. After recording his first 1,000-yard rushing campaign in 1976, Payton gifted all of his offensive linemen, including Jackson, gold watches. A durable offensive lineman, Jackson started 70 of 74 games from 1975 to 1979, including a streak of 50 consecutive starts from 1976 to 1979. “He was light on his feet and great on sweeps,” said former Chicago Bears head coach Jack Pardee (1975–1977). “He was a good run blocker and at the time we were a good running team. Our brand of football fit him to a tee.” In 1981, Jackson was signed to a pair of one-year contracts. In 1984, he was cut by the Bears in training camp and was signed as a free agent by the Buccaneers. After appearing in six games for the Bucs, including the season opener against the Bears, a 34–14 loss at Soldier Field, he was released during the 1984 season.

== Personal life ==
After his playing days, Jackson worked as a physical education instructor at the Chicago Center for New Direction, a community house for wards of the state. Jackson was inducted into the University of Tampa Hall of Fame in 1985 and the Jacksonville Sports Hall of Fame in 1987.

== Death ==
He died on November 20, 2023, in Jacksonville, Florida. He was 72 years old.
