= Allan Ellis (American football) =

American football player (1951–2013)

No. 48
- Position: Cornerback

Personal information
- Born: August 19, 1951; Los Angeles, California, U.S.
- Died: September 18, 2013 (aged 62); Chicago, Illinois, U.S.
- Listed height: 5 ft 11 in (1.80 m)
- Listed weight: 185 lb (84 kg)

Career information
- High school: Centennial (CA)
- College: UCLA
- NFL draft: 1973: 5th round, 107th overall pick

Career history
- Chicago Bears (1973–1980); San Diego Chargers (1981)

Awards and highlights
- Pro Bowl (1977); 100 greatest Bears of All-Time; First-team All-Pac-8 (1972)

Career NFL statistics
- Interceptions: 22
- Int yards: 185
- Defensive TDs: 1
- Stats at Pro Football Reference

Allan Delon Ellis (August 19, 1951 – September 18, 2013) was an American professional football player who was a cornerback for nine seasons in the National Football League (NFL). He played college football for the UCLA Bruins. In 1977, Ellis was named to his lone Pro Bowl, and is the first Chicago Bears cornerback to be named.

On September 18, 2013, Ellis died in Chicago.
