= Dan Neal =

American football player (born 1949)

No. 50, 51, 52
- Position: Center

Personal information
- Born: August 30, 1949 (age 77); Corbin, Kentucky, U.S.
- Listed height: 6 ft 4 in (1.93 m)
- Listed weight: 250 lb (113 kg)

Career information
- High school: Atherton (KY)
- College: Kentucky
- NFL draft: 1973: 11th round, 270th overall pick

Career history
- Baltimore Colts (1973–1974); Chicago Bears (1975–1983)

Career NFL statistics
- Games played: 134
- Games started: 94
- Fumble recoveries: 1
- Stats at Pro Football Reference

Thomas Daniel Neal (born August 30, 1949) is an American former professional football player who was an offensive lineman for 11 seasons with the Baltimore Colts and Chicago Bears of the National Football League (NFL) from 1973 to 1983. He was named offensive line coach in 2007 for the Texas vs. The Nation game, winning a 24–20 victory in Sun Bowl Stadium.

Neal spent 11 years as a player, 15 years as a coach, totaling 26 total years in the NFL. He served as team captain his Junior and Senior years at the University of Kentucky. He was selected in the 11th round by the Colts in 1973, remaining for 2 seasons. He played for the Chicago Bears from 1975 to 1983 blocking for Walter Payton, and as a kick snapper.

After breaking his back he began his coaching career with the Philadelphia Eagles where he coached special teams in 1986-'87 and offensive line '88-91. He then followed Buddy Ryan to the Arizona Cardinals and was the offensive line coach for 1994–95. He coached under Mike Ditka as the tight end coach for the New Orleans Saints 1997–99. (He was the only person to play and coach for Ditka). He moved to the Tennessee Titans as their offensive assistant in 2000. He ended his coaching career as tight end coach for the Buffalo Bills 2001-'03.

Neal was born August 30, 1949, in Corbin, Ky. He and his wife Barbara have 2 daughters Kelly and Tiffany.

Dan has been inducted into Kentucky Athletic Hall of Fame, Kentucky Pro Football Hall of Fame and the Atherton High School Hall of Fame.

After retiring from football Dan owned and operated Coach's Fitness Club that had locations in Louisville and Prospect Kentucky.
