= Len Walterscheid =

American football player (born 1954)

No. 23, 49, 45
- Position: Safety

Personal information
- Born: September 13, 1954 (age 72); Gainesville, Texas, U.S.
- Listed height: 5 ft 11 in (1.80 m)
- Listed weight: 190 lb (86 kg)

Career information
- High school: Grand (Moab, Utah)
- College: Southern Utah
- NFL draft: 1977: undrafted

Career history
- Chicago Bears (1977–1982); Buffalo Bills (1983–1984)

Career NFL statistics
- Interceptions: 7
- Fumble recoveries: 6
- Touchdowns: 1
- Stats at Pro Football Reference

Leonard Raymond Walterscheid (/ˈwɔːltərʃaɪd/ WAWL-tər-shyde; born September 13, 1954) is an American former professional football player who was a safety for eight seasons in the National Football League (NFL) with the Chicago Bears and Buffalo Bills. He played college football for the Southern Utah Thunderbirds.
