= Greg Latta =

American football player (1952–1994)

No. 44, 88
- Position: Tight end

Personal information
- Born: October 13, 1952; Newark, New Jersey, U.S.
- Died: September 28, 1994 (aged 41); Newark, New Jersey, U.S.
- Listed height: 6 ft 3 in (1.91 m)
- Listed weight: 226 lb (103 kg)

Career information
- High school: Newark (NJ) South Side
- College: Morgan State
- NFL draft: 1974: 8th round, 188th overall pick

Career history
- Florida Blazers (1974); Chicago Bears (1975–1980)

Awards and highlights
- All-WFL (1974); Morgan State Hall of Fame

Career NFL statistics
- Receptions: 90
- Receiving yards: 1,081
- Receiving TDs: 7
- Stats at Pro Football Reference

Gregory Edwin Latta (October 13, 1952 – September 28, 1994) was an American professional football player. As tight end, he was selected by the Baltimore Colts of the National Football League (NFL), but played instead for the Florida Blazers of the World Football League (WFL) in 1974. He was traded to the Chicago Bears in 1975 for third- and seventh-round draft picks, along with the head coach of the Blazers, Jack Pardee. Latta was a member of the Bears from 1975 to 1979.

In his rookie season with the Florida Blazers, Latta caught 39 passes for 815 yards and nine touchdown receptions. The Blazers went to the 1974 World Bowl Championship game falling 22-21 to the Birmingham Americans.

During his 5-year NFL career, the 6-foot-3, 227-pound tight end caught 90 passes for 1,081 yards and 7 touchdowns. On special teams, he returned 3 kickoffs for 22 yards.

== Background ==
Latta attended South Side High School in Newark and Morgan State College in Baltimore, Maryland.

== Death ==
He died on September 28, 1994, at St. Michael's Hospital of an apparent heart attack, Newark, New Jersey. He was 41 years old.
