= Virgil Livers =

American football player (born 1952)

No. 24
- Position: Cornerback

Personal information
- Born: March 26, 1952 (age 74); Fairfield, Kentucky, U.S.
- Listed height: 5 ft 8 in (1.73 m)
- Listed weight: 176 lb (80 kg)

Career information
- High school: Nelson County (KY)
- College: Western Kentucky
- NFL draft: 1975: 4th round, 83rd overall pick

Career history
- Chicago Bears (1975–1979); Chicago Blitz (1983–1984)

Awards and highlights
- Western Kentucky Hilltoppers Jersey No. 24 retired; Western Kentucky University Athletic Hall of Fame

Career NFL statistics
- Interceptions: 12
- Fumble recoveries: 6
- Touchdowns: 2
- Stats at Pro Football Reference

Virgil Chester Livers Jr. (/ˈlaɪvərs/ LY-vərs; born March 26, 1952) is an American former professional football player who was a cornerback in the National Football League (NFL). He was selected by the Chicago Bears in the fourth round of the 1975 NFL draft. He played college football for the Western Kentucky Hilltoppers.

Livers is known for a testicle injury during his NFL career with the Chicago Bears, and there are a number of articles (as well as the film, Hot Tub Time Machine, though not by name) on football injuries and the importance of wearing cups that reference his injury, and some that go into excruciating detail.

Livers also played for the Chicago Blitz of the United States Football League (USFL) from 1983 to 1984 as a defensive back. The team went 17–20 in those two years.

Livers was an assistant principal at Bowling Green High School from 1998 to 2017. In 2017, Livers was inducted into the Kentucky Pro Football Hall of Fame. He was also the first football head coach at Greenwood High School in Bowling Green KY and got the first school win in 1992 versus Westmoreland in the schools 30th ever high school football game.
