= Revie Sorey =

American football player (born 1953)

No. 69
- Position: Guard

Personal information
- Born: September 10, 1953 (age 73); Brooklyn, New York, U.S.
- Listed height: 6 ft 2 in (1.88 m)
- Listed weight: 260 lb (118 kg)

Career information
- High school: Boys (Brooklyn)
- College: Illinois
- NFL draft: 1975: 5th round, 110th overall pick

Career history
- Chicago Bears (1975–1983)

Awards and highlights
- Second-team All-American (1974); 2× Second-team All-Big Ten (1973, 1974)

Career NFL statistics
- Games played: 109
- Games started: 77
- Stats at Pro Football Reference

Revie Cee Sorey Jr. (/ˈriːviː ˈsɔːriː/ REE-vee SOR-ee; born September 10, 1953) is a former American professional football player who was an offensive guard for nine seasons with the Chicago Bears of the National Football League (NFL). He played college football for the Illinois Fighting Illini.

Revie suffered a stroke in March 2012.
