= Mike Hartenstine =

American football player (born 1953)

No. 73, 78
- Position: Defensive end

Personal information
- Born: July 27, 1953 (age 73); Bethlehem, Pennsylvania, U.S.
- Listed height: 6 ft 3 in (1.91 m)
- Listed weight: 251 lb (114 kg)

Career information
- High school: Bethlehem (PA) Liberty (1971)
- College: Penn State (1975)
- NFL draft: 1975: 2nd round, 31st overall pick

Career history
- Chicago Bears (1975–1986); Minnesota Vikings (1987)

Awards and highlights
- Super Bowl champion (XX); PFWA All-Rookie Team (1975); 100 greatest Bears of All-Time; Consensus All-American (1974); First-team All-East (1974)

Career NFL statistics
- Sacks: 55
- Fumble recoveries: 17
- Defensive touchdowns: 2
- Stats at Pro Football Reference

Michael Albert Hartenstine (born July 27, 1953) is an American former professional football player who was a defensive end in the National Football League (NFL). He played for the Chicago Bears from 1975 to 1986 and the Minnesota Vikings in 1987.

== Early life and college ==
Hartenstine was born on July 27, 1953, in Bethlehem, Pennsylvania, in the Lehigh Valley region of eastern Pennsylvania, where he played high school football at Liberty High School in Bethlehem. He played college football at Pennsylvania State University, where he was a collegiate All-American.

== Professional career ==
Hartenstine entered the 1975 NFL draft and was selected by the Chicago Bears in the second round with the 31st overall pick. In his 1975 rookie season with the Bears, he was named to the Pro Football Writers of America NFL All-Rookie Team.

Hartenstine was the oldest player on the Super Bowl XX-winning Bears team in 1985. In his career with the Bears, he played in 184 games and had 55 career sacks.

In 2019, Hartenstine was named to the Bears' "100 Greatest Bears of All-Time".
