= 1974 All-Pacific-8 Conference football team =

The 1974 All-Pacific-8 Conference football team consists of American football players chosen by various organizations for All-Pacific-8 Conference teams for the 1974 NCAA Division I football season.

== Offensive selections ==
=== Quarterbacks ===
- Steve Bartkowski, California (AP-1; UPI-1)
- Pat Haden, USC (AP-2)

=== Running backs ===
- Anthony Davis, USC (AP-1; UPI-1)
- Chuck Muncie, California (AP-1; UPI-1)
- Scott Laidlaw, Stanford (AP-2)
- Robin Earl, Washington (AP-2)

=== Wide receivers ===
- Steve Rivera, California (AP-1; UPI-1)
- Norm Andersen, UCLA (AP-1)
- Dwight McDonald, San Diego State (UPI-1)
- John McKay Jr., USC (AP-2)
- Lee Overton, Oregon State (AP-2)

=== Tight ends ===
- Jim Obradovich, USC (AP-1; UPI-1)
- Dave Brown, Oregon State (AP-2)

=== Tackles ===
- Jeff Hart, Oregon State (AP-1)
- Marvin Powell, USC (AP-1)
- Keith Rowen, Stanford (UPI-1)
- Eugene Clark, UCLA (UPI-1)
- Steve Knutson, USC (AP-2)
- Phil McKinnely, UCLA (AP-2)

=== Guards ===
- Steve Ostermann, Washington State (AP-1; UPI-1)
- Bill Bain, USC (AP-1)
- Chris Mackie, California (UPI-1)
- Randy Cross, UCLA (AP-2)
- Myke Horton, UCLA (AP-2)

=== Centers ===
- Geoff Reece, Washington State (AP-1)
- Greg Krpalek, Oregon State (UPI-1)

== Defensive selections ==
=== Linemen ===
- Pat Donovan, Stanford (AP-1; UPI-1)
- Gary Jeter, USC (AP-1)
- Art Riley, USC (AP-1)
- Drew Palin, Stanford (UPI-1)
- Jerry Hackenbruck, Oregon State (AP-2)
- Dave Pear, Washington (AP-2)
- Otha Bradley, USC (AP-2)

=== Linebackers ===
- Gary Larsen, Washington State (AP-1; UPI-1)
- Gordon Riegel, Stanford (AP-1; UPI-1)
- Richard Wood, USC (AP-1; UPI-1)
- Ed Powell, USC (AP-1)
- Dave Wasick, San Jose State (UPI-1)
- Fulton Kuykendall, UCLA (UPI-1)
- Bob Horn, Oregon State (AP-2)
- Dale Mitchell, USC (AP-2)
- Dale Curry, UCLA (AP-2)

=== Defensive backs ===
- Marvin Cobb, USC (AP-1; UPI-1)
- Steve Donnelly, Oregon (AP-1; UPI-1)
- Charlie Phillips, USC (AP-1)
- Danny Reece, USC (AP-1)
- Doc Blanchard, Stanford (UPI-1)
- Louis Wright, San Jose State (UPI-1)
- Herm Edwards, California (AP-2)
- John Nanoski, UCLA (AP-2)
- Kent Pearce, UCLA (AP-2)

== Special teams ==
=== Placekicker ===
- Chris Limahelu, USC (AP-1)
- Joe Danelo, Washington State (AP-2)

=== Punter ===
- Skip Boyd, Washington (AP-1)
- Gavin Hedrick, Washington State (AP-2)

== Key ==
AP = Associated Press

UPI = United Press International

== See also ==
- 1974 College Football All-America Team
