= 1974 USC Trojans football team =

American college football season

1974 USC Trojans football

Coaches' Poll national champion FWAA national champion NFF national champion Pac-8 champion Rose Bowl champion

Rose Bowl, W 18–17 vs. Ohio State
- Conference: Pacific-8 Conference

Ranking
- Coaches: No. 1
- AP: No. 2
- Record: 10–1–1 (6–0–1 Pac-8)
- Head coach: John McKay (15th season)
- Offensive coordinator: John Robinson (3rd season)
- Captains: Pat Haden; Richard Wood
- Home stadium: Los Angeles Memorial Coliseum

1974 Pacific-8 Conference football standings
	Conf.					Overall
Team	W		L		T	W		L		T
No. 2 USC $	6	–	0	–	1	10	–	1	–	1
Stanford	5	–	1	–	1	5	–	4	–	2
California	4	–	2	–	1	7	–	3	–	1
UCLA	4	–	2	–	1	6	–	3	–	2
Washington	3	–	4	–	0	5	–	6	–	0
Oregon State	3	–	4	–	0	3	–	8	–	0
Washington State	1	–	6	–	0	2	–	9	–	0
Oregon	0	–	7	–	0	2	–	9	–	0
$ – Conference champion; Rankings from AP Poll

The 1974 USC Trojans football team was an American football team that represented the University of Southern California (USC) as a member of the Pacific-8 Conference during the 1974 NCAA Division I football season. In their 15th year under head coach John McKay, the Trojans compiled a 10–1–1 record (6–0–1 in conference games), won the Pac 8 championship, and outscored their opponents by a total of 363 to 142. They lost the season opener on the road against No. 20 Arkansas and went undefeated the rest of the season, including a week 2 victory over No. 8 Pittsburgh and a comeback victory over No. 5 Notre Dame in which they scored 55 unanswered points after trailing 24–0. They concluded the season with an 18–17 victory over No. 3 Ohio State in the 1975 Rose Bowl, converting a two-point conversion in the fourth quarter for the win.

USC was ranked No. 1 in the final United Press International (UPI) poll, receiving 27 of the 34 first-place votes from the coaches panel. The Trojans were ranked No. 2 in the final AP poll, trailing Oklahoma; Oklahoma was not included in the UPI poll as the school was on probation for recruiting violations.

Running back Anthony Davis tallied 1,354 rushing yards and 13 touchdowns, finished second behind Archie Griffin in the Heisman Trophy voting, and won the W. J. Voit Memorial Trophy as the outstanding college football player on the Pacific Coast. Davis and linebacker Richard Wood were consensus first-team picks on the 1974 All-America college football team. Tight end Jim Obradovich and guard Bill Bain also received first-team All-America honors from one or more selectors.

== Schedule ==
Date	Opponent	Rank	Site	Result	Attendance	Source
September 14	at No. 20 Arkansas*	No. 5	War Memorial Stadium; Little Rock, AR	L 7–22	54,622	
September 28	at No. 8 Pittsburgh*	No. 18	Pitt Stadium; Pittsburgh, PA	W 16–7	52,934	
October 5	Iowa*	No. 9	Los Angeles Memorial Coliseum; Los Angeles, CA	W 41–3	52,095	
October 12	vs. Washington State	No. 7	Joe Albi Stadium; Spokane, WA	W 54–7	32,000	
October 19	at Oregon	No. 6	Autzen Stadium; Eugene, OR	W 16–7	32,500	
October 26	Oregon State^{†}	No. 6	Los Angeles Memorial Coliseum; Los Angeles, CA	W 35–10	52,392	
November 2	California	No. 6	Los Angeles Memorial Coliseum; Los Angeles, CA	T 15–15	53,921	
November 9	at Stanford	No. 11	Stanford Stadium; Stanford, CA (rivalry)	W 35–10	83,500	
November 16	Washington	No. 8	Los Angeles Memorial Coliseum; Los Angeles, CA	W 42–11	51,157	
November 23	at UCLA	No. 8	Los Angeles Memorial Coliseum; Los Angeles, CA (Victory Bell)	W 34–9	82,467	
November 30	No. 5 Notre Dame*	No. 6	Los Angeles Memorial Coliseum; Los Angeles, CA (rivalry)	W 55–24	83,522	
January 1, 1975	vs. No. 3 Ohio State*	No. 5	Rose Bowl; Pasadena, CA (Rose Bowl)	W 18–17	106,721	
*Non-conference game; ^{†}Homecoming; Rankings from AP Poll released prior to the game

== Game summaries ==
=== Washington ===
Team	1	2	3	4	Total
Washington	0	3	0	8	11
• USC	7	14	14	7	42

- Date: November 16
- Location: Los Angeles Memorial Coliseum • Los Angeles, CA
- Game attendance: 51,157

Scoring summary
1	USC	Diggs 36-yard pass from Haden (Limahelu kick)	USC 7-0
2	USC	Davis 7-yard pass from Haden (Limahelu kick)	USC 14-0
2	USC	Davis 1-yard run (Limahelu kick)	USC 21-0
2	WASH	Robbins 46-yard field goal	USC 21-3
3	USC	Carter 1-yard run (Limahelu kick)	USC 28-3
3	USC	Evans 3-yard run (Limahelu kick)	USC 35-3
4	USC	Ford 36-yard run (Limahelu kick)	USC 42-3
4	WASH	McBride 4-yard run (Conley pass from McBride)	USC 42-11

== Roster ==
1974 USC Trojans football team roster
Players
Coaches
Offense

Pos.	#	Name	Class
G	66	Bill Bain
RB	42	Ricky Bell	So
RB	28	Anthony Davis	Sr
WR	26	Shelton Diggs	So
QB	8	Vince Evans	So
QB	10	Pat Haden	Sr
G	61	Donnie Hickman	So
G	65	Melvin Jackson	Jr
WR	25	J.K. McKay	Sr
TE	89	Jim Obradovich
OT	76	Marvin Powell	So

Defense

Pos.	#	Name	Class
DB	44	Mike Burns	So
DT	79	Gary Jeter	So
LB	57	David Lewis	So
DT		Greg Marderian
LB	52	Rod Martin	So
CB	46	Danny Reece	Jr
LB	55	Eric Williams	So

Special teams

Pos.	#	Name	Class
PK	11	Chris Limahelu
K/P	39	Glen Walker	So

Head coach

- John McKay (15th year)

Coordinators/assistant coaches

Legend

- (C) Team captain
- (S) Suspended
- (I) Ineligible
- Injured
- Redshirt

== Statistics ==
=== Anthony Davis ===
Running back Anthony Davis led the team with 1,354 rushing yards on 288 carries during the regular season for an average of 4.7 yards per carry. He added 67 yards on 13 carries in the 1975 Rose Bowl. Davis also led the team with 15 touchdowns for 90 points scored. He also ranked third nationally with 1,908 all-purpose yards, including pass receptions and kickoff and punt returns.

Against UCLA, he broke O. J. Simpson's Pac-8 career rushing record. He concluded the 1974 regular season with career totals of 52 touchdowns, 314 points scored, and 3,657 rushing yards.

He also set a national career record with six touchdowns on kickoff returns and a single-season record with three kickoff returns for touchdown during the 1974 season.

=== Others ===
The team's leading rushers following Davis were Allen Carter (505 yards, 5.4 yards per carry), Ricky Bell (261 yards, 6.7 yards per carry), Pat Haden (240 yards, 2.6 yards per carry), Dave Farmer (204 yards, 7.6 yards per carry), and Vince Evans (201 yards, 4.8 yards per carry).

Quarterback Pat Haden completed 58 of 127 passes (45.7%) for 807 yards, 11 touchdowns, nine interceptions, and a 113 passer rating. Backup Vince Evans completed six of 16 passes (37.5%) for 113 yards.

The team's leading receivers were J. K. McKay (29 receptions for 446 yards and seven touchdowns), Anthony Davis (14 receptions for 87 yards and two touchdowns), and Shelton Diggs (eight receptions for 200 yards and two touchdowns). Diggs caught the game-winning two point conversion in the 1975 Rose Bowl.

== Awards and honors ==
=== Anthony Davis ===
Running back Anthony Davis received numerous awards and honors for his performance during the 1974 season, including the following:

- Davis finished second behind Archie Griffin in the 1974 Heisman Trophy voting. Griffin received 483 first-place votes to 120 for Davis.
- He was a consensus first-team pick on the 1974 All-America college football team, receiving first-team honors from, among others, the American Football Coaches Association (AFCA), Associated Press (AP), Football Writers Association of America (FWAA), United Press International (UPI), and Time.
- For the second consecutive year, Davis won the W. J. Voit Memorial Trophy as the outstanding college football player on the Pacific Coast. He received 28 of 34 first-place votes. He was the third player in the history of the award to receive the honor twice, following Jon Arnett (1955-56) and Jim Plunkett (1969-70).
- He was selected as the 1974 college player of the year by ABC Television.

Davis was inducted into the College Football Hall of Fame in 2005.

=== All-America honors ===
Linebacker Richard Wood, sometimes known as "Batman", was a consensus first-team All-American, receiving first-team honors from multiple selectors, including the AP, UPI, and Newspaper Enterprise Association (NEA). It was Wood's third consecutive year as an All-American. Wood was inducted into the College Football Hall of Fame in 2007.

In addition to Davis and Wood, three other USC players received first-team All-America honors from one or more selectors:

- Guard Bill Bain received first-team honors from The Sporting News and Time. Time described Bain as a "bruiser who can play anywhere along the line. He's been prying open gaps for Anthony Davis for two years."
- Tight end Jim Obradovich received first-team honors from the NEA.
- Safety Charlie Phillips received first-team honors from the FWAA.

=== All-Pac-8 honors ===
Twelve USC players received first-team honors from the AP or UPI on the 1974 All-Pacific-8 Conference football team: Davis (AP-1, UPI-1); Obradovich (AP-1, UPI-1); Wood (AP-1, UPI-1); Bain (AP-1); Phillips (AP-1); safety Marvin Cobb (AP-1, UPI-1); tackle Marvin Powell (AP-1); defensive lineman Gary Jeter (AP-1); defensive lineman Art Riley (AP-1); linebacker Ed Powell (AP-1); defensive back Danny Reece (AP-1); and placekicker Chris Limahelu (AP-1). Five others received second-team honors: quarterback Pat Haden (AP-2); tackle Steve Knutson (AP-2); wide receiver J. K. McKay (AP-2); defensive lineman Otha Bradley (AP-2); linebacker Dale Mitchell (AP-2).
