= 1975 Rose Bowl =

American college football game

- 61st Rose Bowl Game
Ohio State Buckeyes	USC Trojans
(10–1)	(9–1–1)
Big Ten	Pac-8
17	18
Head coach: Woody Hayes	Head coach: John McKay
AP / Coaches; 3 / 2	AP / Coaches; 5 / 4
	1	2	3	4	Total
Ohio State	0	7	0	10	17
USC	3	0	0	15	18
- Date: January 1, 1975
- Season: 1974
- Stadium: Rose Bowl
- Location: Pasadena, California
- MVP: Pat Haden (USC QB); J. K. McKay (USC SE)
- Favorite: Ohio State by 6 points
- Referee: Charles Moffett (Pac-8) (split crew: Pac-8, Big Ten)
- Attendance: 106,721

United States TV coverage
- Network: NBC
- Announcers: Curt Gowdy, Al DeRogatis
- Nielsen ratings: 31.3

The 1975 Rose Bowl was the 61st edition of the college football bowl game, played at the Rose Bowl in Pasadena, California, on Wednesday, January 1. The fifth-ranked USC Trojans of the Pacific-8 Conference defeated #3 Ohio State Buckeyes of the Big Ten Conference, 18–17 in one of the most exciting games in the history of the Rose Bowl.

After a touchdown pass with two minutes remaining to draw within a point, USC quarterback Pat Haden passed to Shelton Diggs for a two-point conversion to take the lead. It gave the Trojans the Rose Bowl victory and the UPI coaches poll national title.

This was the third consecutive year for these teams in the Rose Bowl: USC won in 1973, Ohio State in 1974.

== Teams ==
=== Ohio State Buckeyes ===
The defending Rose Bowl champs were the nation's top-ranked team for much of the season, until they were upset by Michigan State 16–13 at East Lansing on November 9. Two weeks later, the Buckeyes earned the Rose Bowl berth with a 12–10 victory over Michigan, when kicker Mike Lantry's last-second field goal attempt sailed just wide.

Ohio State was favored to win the Rose Bowl by six points.

=== USC Trojans ===
USC was upset by Arkansas 22–7 in Little Rock in the season opener, then reeled off five straight wins before a 15–15 tie at home against California. They won their final four games, the most dramatic being a season-ending 55–24 win over #5 Notre Dame in which the Trojans trailed 24–0.

== Scoring summary ==
=== First quarter ===
- USC – Chris Limahelu - 30-yard field goal.

=== Second quarter ===
- OSU – Champ Henson - 2-yard run (PAT - Tom Klaban kick)

=== Third quarter ===
No scoring

=== Fourth quarter ===
- USC – Jim Obradovich 9-yard pass from Pat Haden (PAT - Limahelu kick).
- OSU – Cornelius Greene 3-yard run (PAT - Klaban kick)
- OSU – Klaban - 32-yard field goal.
- USC – J. K. McKay 38-yard pass from Haden (PAT - Haden pass to Shelton Diggs)

== Aftermath ==
Undefeated Oklahoma was the #1 team in the AP poll, but were on probation and ineligible for a bowl game. The UPI poll excluded teams on probation, and after the regular season, the UPI had Alabama first, followed by Ohio State, Michigan, USC, and Auburn. The Trojans' dramatic Rose Bowl win over Ohio State enabled them to leapfrog idle Michigan, and when Notre Dame upset Alabama in the Orange Bowl, 13–11, USC was voted #1 in the UPI poll. This game marked USC head coach John McKay's eighth and last appearance in the Rose Bowl and his fifth win.

This was the last season in which the Big Ten and Pac-8 conferences allowed just one bowl team each, to the Rose Bowl. Michigan and twelfth-ranked Michigan State did not participate in this bowl season; USC was the only Pac-8 team in the top twenty of either final poll. Michigan missed the postseason for three straight seasons, despite ten wins each year and an overall record of 30–2–1 (.924).

== Game notes ==
- This contest marked the third straight time the two teams met in the Rose Bowl.
- Head coach John McKay won his fourth national title.
- McKay ended his Rose Bowl career with a 5–3 record, tying Howard Jones for victories.
- Anthony Davis was injured and played less than 1 quarter.
- Quarterback Pat Haden & split end J.K. McKay were named co-MVPs.
- USC kicker Chris Limahelu died of prostate cancer in 2010 at age 59.
- Referee Charles Moffett later served as the head official for the 1982 Stanford vs. California game, which famously ended with a five-lateral, 57-yard kickoff return touchdown through the Stanford Band to give the Golden Bears a 25-20 victory.
