= John McKay (American football) =

American football coach (1923–2001)

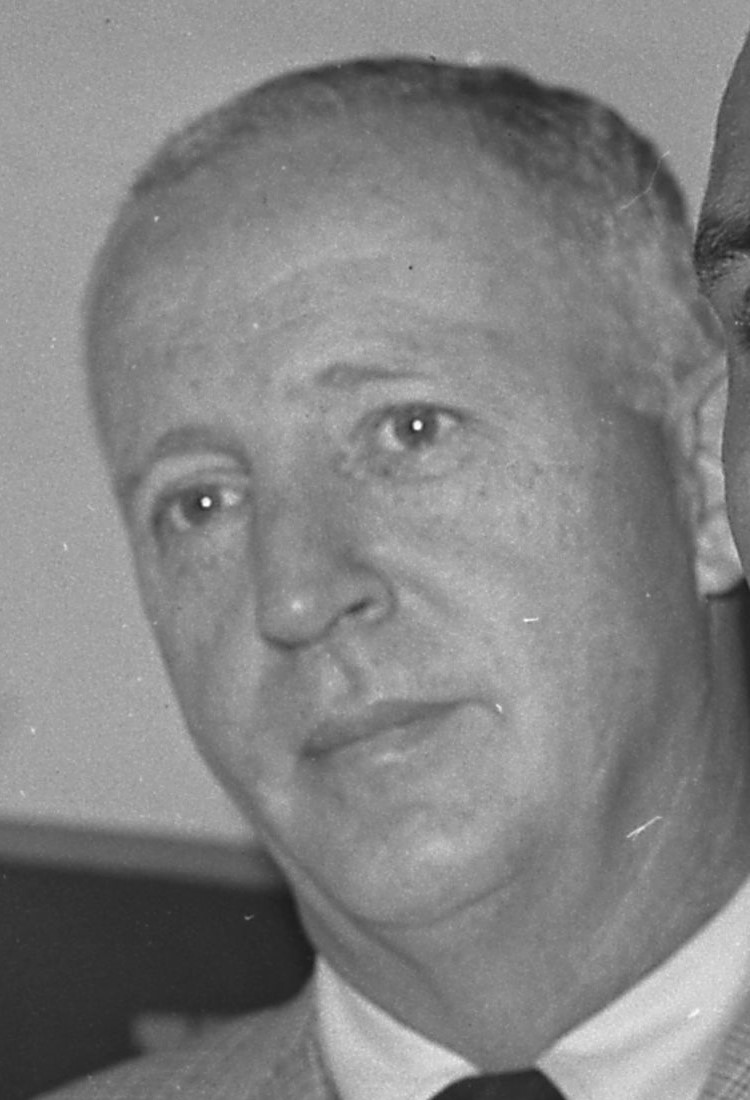
- McKay in 1965

Biographical details
- Born: July 5, 1923; Everettville, West Virginia, U.S.
- Died: June 10, 2001 (aged 77); Tampa, Florida, U.S.

Playing career
- 1946: Purdue
- 1947–1949: Oregon
- Position: Back

Coaching career (HC unless noted)
- 1950–1958: Oregon (assistant)
- 1959: USC (assistant)
- 1960–1975: USC
- 1976–1984: Tampa Bay Buccaneers

Administrative career (AD unless noted)
- 1972–1975: USC

Head coaching record
- Overall: 127–40–8 (college); 44–88–1 (NFL)
- Bowls: 6–3

Accomplishments and honors

Championships
- 4 national (1962, 1967, 1972, 1974); 9 AAWU/Pac-8 (1962, 1964, 1966–1969, 1972–1974)

Awards
- 2× AFCA Coach of the Year (1962, 1972); 2× Eddie Robinson Coach of the Year (1962, 1972); Sporting News College Football COY (1972); Tampa Stadium Krewe of Honor (1991); Tampa Bay Buccaneers' Ring of Honor (2010)
- College Football Hall of Fame; Inducted in 1988 (profile)

John Harvey McKay (July 5, 1923 – June 10, 2001) was an American football coach. He was the head coach at the University of Southern California (USC) from 1960 to 1975 and of the National Football League's Tampa Bay Buccaneers from 1976 to 1984. In sixteen seasons at USC, McKay compiled a record of 127–40–8 (.749) and won nine AAWU/Pac-8 conference titles. His teams made eight appearances in the Rose Bowl, with five wins. Four of his squads captured national titles (1962, 1967, 1972, 1974).

Following a disappointing 1975 season, McKay moved to the NFL as the first head coach of the expansion Tampa Bay Buccaneers. In 1976 and 1977, Tampa Bay lost the first 26 games but improved by the end of the 1970s. The Buccaneers made the playoffs three times under McKay, including an appearance in the NFC Championship Game in 1979. McKay was inducted into the College Football Hall of Fame as a coach in 1988. On January 1, 2014, McKay was named the All-Century Coach of the Rose Bowl Game during the celebration of the 100th Rose Bowl Game; his son represented him in the 2014 Rose Parade.

== Early life, military service, and playing career ==
McKay was born in West Virginia in the now-defunct town of Everettville in Monongalia County, where he was raised as a Roman Catholic. He was the third of five children born to Scots-Irish parents John and Gertrude McKay. His father was a coal mine superintendent who died when John was 13 years old. He grew up in Shinnston, and graduated from Shinnston High School in 1941. Offered a football scholarship to Wake Forest, McKay was on campus enrolling when his widowed mother became ill. He returned home to West Virginia and worked as an electrician's assistant in a coal mine for a year, then enlisted in the U.S. Army Air Force in 1942. McKay served as a tailgunner aboard B-29s and saw action in the Pacific Theatre during World War II.

=== Oregon ===
After the war, he entered college at Purdue University in 1946 at the age of 23, then transferred to the University of Oregon in 1947. He played football as a halfback at both schools. At Purdue he played under former NFL champion quarterback Cecil Isbell alongside Bob DeMoss and Ed Cody, and split time with Ed Ehlers. For the Oregon Ducks, he played alongside quarterback Norm Van Brocklin. The 1948 Ducks went 9–1 in the regular season and 7–0 in the Pacific Coast, co-champions with California. Because the two teams did not meet during the season, the bid to the Rose Bowl was decided by the university presidents, which went to California on a split vote that was not disclosed. Breaking with tradition, the PCC allowed the co-champions to also play in a bowl game. The Ducks accepted an invitation to the Cotton Bowl in Dallas, but were defeated 21–13 by hometown SMU.

Van Brocklin graduated and was selected in the 1949 NFL draft by the Los Angeles Rams; McKay took over the Duck offense in 1949 and called the audibles from his two-point stance as a running back. Without the future NFL Hall of Famer, the Ducks slipped to 4–6 (2–5 in the PCC). Without McKay on the field in 1950, Oregon was 1–9 and winless in conference, including shutouts by UCLA and lowly Idaho. The Ducks scored only 97 points all season and were kept under ten points in half of their games.

== Coaching career ==
=== Assistant coach ===
After graduation from Oregon in 1950, McKay decided to become a coach. He was an assistant for the Ducks for nine seasons, one under Jim Aiken and eight with Len Casanova, who arrived from the University of Pittsburgh in 1951. Improving through the 1950s, the Ducks tied for the conference title in 1957 and played in the 1958 Rose Bowl. Following the 1958 season, McKay moved south to USC as an assistant under third-year head coach Don Clark. A notable member of the USC staff at this time was Al Davis, the offensive line coach. The Trojans were coming off two losing seasons, 1–9 in 1957 and 4–5–1 in 1958. They won their first eight games in 1959 but lost to rivals UCLA and Notre Dame to conclude the season. After failing to defeat either of the two rivals in three years, Clark resigned. McKay was hired as the Trojans' head coach for the 1960 season.

=== USC Trojans ===
In his first two seasons as head coach, McKay's teams enjoyed little success, going 4–6 in 1960 and 4–5–1 in 1961. The Trojans had been on probation and had difficulty recruiting; McKay stated that these two teams were the slowest he had ever been around. Heading into the 1962 season, McKay felt he might be fired by university president Norman Topping; alumni were pressuring Topping to fire McKay, but Topping resisted and gave McKay one more year so he could field a team with players he had recruited. Topping believed that McKay had recruited well and that the team would be successful. Topping proved to be correct. In 1962, McKay guided USC to an 11–0 record, including a 42–37 Rose Bowl victory over #2-ranked Wisconsin, leading to a national championship. USC won a total of four national championships (1962, 1967, 1972, and 1974) during McKay's tenure as head coach, and the 1972 squad is regarded as one of the best teams in college football history. That team went 12–0, defeating five teams ranked 18th or higher by an average of 22 points. They never trailed in the second half of any game, and their closest game was a nine-point win over Stanford. Players from that team included Mike Rae, Pat Haden, Sam Cunningham, Anthony Davis, Lynn Swann, Charlie Young, Gary Jeter, Richard Wood and Charles Phillips. Two of his players, Mike Garrett (1965) and O. J. Simpson (1968), won the Heisman Trophy. McKay popularized the I formation and emphasized a power running game with such plays as "Student Body Left" and "Student Body Right." Through 2021, he remains the winningest head football coach in school history.

On November 26, 1966, Notre Dame crushed USC 51–0 for the worst defeat in the program's history. Reportedly, after the game, McKay vowed never to lose a game to the Fighting Irish again. He denied saying it, however, and in an interview shortly before his death, he clarified that he actually said, "They'll never beat us 51–0 again." After that loss, McKay was 6–1–2 vs. Notre Dame, losing only during the Irish' national championship season of 1973. He even admitted that while growing up, being an Irish Catholic, he was a Notre Dame fan.

=== Tampa Bay Buccaneers ===
After turning down several offers from NFL teams, including the Cleveland Browns, New England Patriots and Los Angeles Rams, McKay was lured to Tampa Bay in 1976 to become the Buccaneers' first head coach. Motivating his decision was the combined fivefold salary increase (totaling $2 million) and the prospect of building a franchise from the ground up. The Buccaneers lost all 14 games in 1976 and the first 12 games of 1977 before finally winning against the New Orleans Saints. The Bucs would also win the last game of the 1977 season over the St. Louis Cardinals for a two-game winning streak.

After winning five games in 1978, the Buccaneers doubled that the following year, posting their first winning season. They clinched the 1979 NFC Central title in the final week by beating the Kansas City Chiefs 3–0 in a driving Tampa rainstorm. They then defeated the Philadelphia Eagles 24–17 in a divisional playoff game to advance to the NFC Championship where, in a defensive battle, they lost to the Los Angeles Rams 9–0. The Buccaneers made two more playoff appearances in 1981 and 1982.

After the 1982 season, McKay strongly supported star quarterback Doug Williams' bid for a better contract; at the time he was making less than 12 backups in the league. However, owner Hugh Culverhouse was unwilling to budge from his initial offer. Williams bolted to the USFL for the 1983 season. Without Williams, McKay's offense appeared to be completely rudderless. The Buccaneers crumbled to a two-win season in 1983, and although they rebounded to win six in 1984, it would be McKay's last. Thoroughly disillusioned, he stepped down as head coach. In the end, despite the Buccaneers' brief success in the early 1980s, McKay forever regretted his decision to leave the Trojans. His son noted that he knew "within the first week after he got to Tampa that he'd made a mistake." McKay later said that, despite the team's rapid ascent to the playoffs, the Tampa Bay Area fans never forgave him for the franchise's 0–26 start. McKay's record with the Buccaneers (his entire NFL career) was a dismal 44–88–1. This was mainly due to winning only seven games in the Bucs' first three seasons combined, though his last two seasons were the first of a league-record 12 consecutive 10-loss seasons. Despite this, McKay was posthumously inducted into Tampa Bay's "Ring of Honor" on December 5, 2010.

As an NFL coach, McKay proved to be a controversial figure. He had an unpredictable personality and was capable of great warmth, but also of scathing sarcasm. Veterans felt that his aloofness hampered his ability to communicate with the team. Near the end of his tenure of head coach, he upset players by not addressing the team at any point before or after the game. He was prone to emotional outbursts, as when he called fans "idiots" for booing Bucs' quarterback Steve Spurrier during the expansion season, and then again later when he applied the term to reporters and opposing players who criticized the team. A 1977 wave of offseason firings saw several executives replaced by men with close ties to McKay, and left the suspicion that he was attempting to surround himself with a staff that would bow easily to his will. Similar accusations were made surrounding his handling of personnel, particularly following the 1976 season and again in the wake of a 1982 trade that sent several players to the San Diego Chargers, alleging that his intolerance of outspoken players was causing him to cut players who could help the team. Some players resented McKay for placing his son Johnny in the starting lineup when they felt that there were better receivers on the team, a move for which McKay humorously gave "nepotism" as the motivation.

Critics frequently questioned whether McKay's biting comments were detrimental to players, some of which described his conduct as "unprofessional". McKay was noted for using the press to criticize players, as when he complained about a young running back's pass-catching ability by sarcastically referring to him as "fabulous". He responded to the ensuing controversy by repeatedly stating, "all of the players played lovely" at the following week's postgame press conference, despite the game having been a loss that eliminated the team from playoff contention. Conversely, McKay could be fiercely protective of his players. He took the media to task for publishing subtly racist descriptions of Doug Williams that insinuated that his mental capacity was inferior, and continually referred to him as a "black quarterback" instead of "a quarterback". A public apology was required after he leveled a string of expletives against a group of fans who had directed racist comments at his players. Despite his adversarial personal relationship with Spurrier, McKay defended him against fans' criticism. He enraged the New York Jets and incurred a large league fine in his final game, in which his attempt to secure an NFL yardage record for running back James Wilder Sr. went to such extremes as to order the defense to lie down and allow the Jets to score a touchdown, in order to quickly regain possession of the ball.

At 44 games under .500 McKay set the record for futility surpassing Bert Bell in 1983, a record he held until Marion Campbell passed him in 1988.

== Family and death ==
McKay was the father of former Buccaneers general manager Rich McKay, who served as CEO of the Atlanta Falcons from 2008 until his firing in 2026. Another son, J. K. McKay, played wide receiver under him twice: first for the Trojans from 1972 to 1975 and then later in the NFL for the Buccaneers from 1976 to 1979. McKay and his wife, Corky, had two daughters, Michele McKay Breese and Terri McKay Florio.

McKay died at St. Joseph's Hospital in Tampa, Florida, from diabetes-related complications on June 10, 2001, at the age of 77. His ashes were spread on the field of the Los Angeles Memorial Coliseum. For his contribution to sports in Los Angeles, he was honored with a Coliseum "Court of Honor" plaque by the Coliseum commissioners.

== Quips ==
McKay became famous for many of his humorous answers during press conferences, for which Philadelphia Eagles coach Dick Vermeil called him "Dial-a-Quote". His notable quips:

- Following the 51–0 loss to Notre Dame in 1966, "I told my team it doesn't matter. There are 750 million people in China who don't even know this game was played. The next day, a guy called me from China and asked, 'What happened, Coach?'"
- "[Former Michigan State Coach] Duffy Daugherty always had a dog because he said, 'When you come home after a defeat the dog will be your friend.' My wife had a dog and we got beat once by Notre Dame 51–0. I came home and it bit me."
- Following a game in 1967 in which O. J. Simpson received over 30 handoffs, McKay was asked "Why are you giving the ball to Simpson so often?" He replied, "Why not? It's not heavy, and he doesn't belong to a union."
- On recruiting his son, J.K., to play football at USC: "I had a rather distinct advantage. I slept with his mother."
- After a series of questionable calls helped Notre Dame tie top-ranked USC in 1968, McKay was asked about the officiating. He answered "I'm not surprised. The referee is a fine Catholic fellow by the name of Patrick Murphy."
- After the Tampa Bay Buccaneers' first unofficial game, he responded to a question, "Well, we didn't block, but we made up for it by not tackling."
- When asked his opinion of the NFL, he said "I've seen what they do in the professional ranks and it's not anything different than what we do here." McKay also did not understand the huge amounts of drama the league built around games, stating "What's so different between losing in the NFL and losing in college? You win, you put a check mark next to the game on the schedule list, and when you lose, you put an X next to it."
- Following a Buccaneer loss, McKay was asked, "What's it like in the professional ranks, coach? Anything special?" He replied, "No I was beat 51–0 in the college ranks. It's the same thing."
- Standing on the sidelines during a game, McKay said, "Can't stop a pass, or a run...otherwise we're in great shape."
- During a team meeting, McKay told his players that games are won and lost in "the trenches." He then spotted Howard Fest sleeping in the back. McKay yelled, "FEST FEST, where are games won and lost?" Fest replied, "Right here with the Buccaneers coach."
- Following a Buccaneers loss in their early seasons, McKay was asked what he thought of his offense's "execution." He replied, "I'm in favor of it." (This story is apparently apocryphal.)
- "Capece is kaput," referring to Buccaneers kicker Bill Capece after he missed a field goal and an extra point in the next-to-last game of the 1983 season (vs. Green Bay on Monday Night Football), and did not travel to Detroit for the season finale.
- After the Buccaneers won their first regular season game against the New Orleans Saints during the 1977 season 33–14, McKay mused, "Three or four plane crashes and we're in the playoffs."
- After special teams failures caused a loss to the Minnesota Vikings in 1979 instead of clinching first place in the NFC Central, McKay said "I'm sick and tired of people booing me. I wish they'd boo the people who can't block".
- After receiving harsh criticism from the media about McKay's coaching skills in the NFL, McKay replied "You guys don't know the difference between a football and a bunch of bananas." In the next interview, members of the media left bananas for McKay. He then replied, "You guys don't know the difference between a football and a Mercedes Benz."

== Head coaching record ==
=== College ===
Year	Team	Overall	Conference	Standing	Bowl/playoffs	Coaches^{#}	AP^{°}
USC Trojans (Pacific-8 Conference) (1960–1975)
1960	USC	4–6	3–1	2nd			
1961	USC	4–5–1	2–1–1	T–2nd			
1962	USC	11–0	4–0	1st	W Rose	1	1
1963	USC	7–3	3–1	2nd			16
1964	USC	7–3	3–1	T–1st		10	10
1965	USC	7–2–1	4–1	2nd		9	10
1966	USC	7–4	4–1	T–1st	L Rose	18	
1967	USC	10–1	6–1	1st	W Rose	1	1
1968	USC	9–1–1	6–0	1st	L Rose	2	4
1969	USC	10–0–1	6–0	1st	W Rose	4	3
1970	USC	6–4–1	3–4	T–6th		19	15
1971	USC	6–4–1	3–2–1	3rd			20
1972	USC	12–0	7–0	1st	W Rose	1	1
1973	USC	9–2–1	7–0	1st	L Rose	7	8
1974	USC	10–1–1	6–0–1	1st	W Rose	1	2
1975	USC	8–4	3–4	5th	W Liberty	19	17
USC:		127–40–8	70–17–3				
Total:		127–40–8					
National championship Conference title Conference division title or championship game berth
^{#}Rankings from final Coaches Poll.; ^{°}Rankings from final AP Poll.

=== NFL ===
Team	Year	Regular season					Postseason			
Team	Year	Won	Lost	Ties	Win %	Finish	Won	Lost	Win %	Result
TB	1976	0	14	0	.000	5th in AFC West	–	–	–	–
TB	1977	2	12	0	.143	5th in NFC Central	–	–	–	–
TB	1978	5	11	0	.312	5th in NFC Central	–	–	–	–
TB	1979	10	6	0	.625	1st in NFC Central	1	1	.500	Lost to Los Angeles Rams in NFC Championship Game.
TB	1980	5	10	1	.333	4th in NFC Central	–	–	–	–
TB	1981	9	7	0	.563	1st in NFC Central	0	1	.000	Lost to Dallas Cowboys in NFC Divisional Game.
TB	1982	5	4	0	.556	7th in NFC	0	1	.000	Lost to Dallas Cowboys in NFC 1st Round Game
TB	1983	2	14	0	.125	5th in NFC Central	–	–	–	–
TB	1984	6	10	0	.375	3rd in NFC Central	–	–	–	–
Total		44	88	1	.333		1	3	.250	

== See also ==
- List of presidents of the American Football Coaches Association
