= 1977 Chicago Bears season =

NFL team season

- Owner: George Halas
- General manager: Jim Finks
- Head coach: Jack Pardee
- Home stadium: Soldier Field

Results
- Record: 9–5
- Division place: 2nd NFC Central
- Playoffs: Lost Divisional Playoffs (at Cowboys) 7–37

The 1977 Chicago Bears season was their 58th regular season completed in the National Football League. The team finished with a 9–5 record, which was their first winning season since 1967 and earned them a wild card spot against the Dallas Cowboys, who eventually beat the Bears 37–7 en route to a Super Bowl victory. This was their first postseason appearance since winning the 1963 championship. They secured this by winning their last six games, including among others the last of the Tampa Bay Buccaneers’ record run of 26 consecutive losses.

Sid Gillman was hired to serve as offensive coordinator of the team. Star halfback Walter Payton had the best season of his career as he led the entire NFL in rushing (1,852 yards), 275 of those 1,852 came on a November 20 game against their division rivals the Minnesota Vikings and he did it despite coming down with the flu on a dark rainy day at Soldier Field.

A week after the Dallas playoff loss, Coach Pardee stunned the team by resigning to take the head coaching position of the Washington Redskins (George Allen having been fired after the Redskins were eliminated from the playoffs by a Bears overtime victory over the New York Giants in the last game of the regular season). When Gillman expressed desire to open up the offense, those ideas were rejected by upper staff, which led to the resignation of Gillman.

== Offseason ==
=== NFL draft ===
1977 Chicago Bears draft
Round	Pick	Player	Position	College	Notes
1	14	Ted Albrecht	Offensive tackle	California	
2	43	Mike Spivey	Cornerback	Colorado	
3	61	Robin Earl	Tight end	Washington	
6	140	Vince Evans	Quarterback	USC	
7	182	Gerald Butler	Wide receiver	Nicholls State	
9	238	Nick Buonamici	Defensive tackle	Ohio State	
10	266	Dennis Breckner	Defensive end	Miami (FL)	
11	294	Connie Zelencik	Center	Purdue	
12	322	Terry Irvin	Defensive back	Jackson State	
Made roster * Made at least one Pro Bowl during career

=== Undrafted free agents ===
1977 undrafted free agents of note
Player	Position	College
Mike Andrus	Safety	Richmond
Chris Hoskins	Running back	Missouri Western
Neil Little	Defensive back	Northwestern
Tony Madau	Punter	Nevada
Len Walterscheid	Safety	Southern Utah
Scott Yelvington	Wide receiver	Northwestern

== Roster ==
1977 Chicago Bears roster
Quarterbacks (QB): 7 Bob Avellini; 8 Vince Evans; 15 Mike Phipps; Running backs (RB): 25 Art Best; 39 Robin Earl; 35 Roland Harper; 22 Johnny Musso; 34 Walter Payton; Wide receivers (WR): 80 Bo Rather; 83 Steve Rivera; 85 Steve Schubert; 89 James Scott; Tight ends (TE): 81 Chuck Bradley; 88 Greg Latta	Offensive linemen (OL): 64 Ted Albrecht T; 63 Fred Dean G; 65 Noah Jackson G; 62 Dan Jiggetts T; 70 Dennis Lick T; 52 Dan Neal C/G; 53 Dan Peiffer C; 69 Revie Sorey G; Defensive linemen (DL): 73 Mike Hartenstine DE; 74 Jerry Meyers DE; 87 Billy Newsome DE; 68 Jim Osborne DT; 76 Ron Rydalch DT; 75 Jeff Sevy DE	Linebackers (LB): 50 Waymond Bryant OLB; 55 Doug Buffone OLB; 59 Gary Campbell OLB; 54 Tom Hicks MLB; 58 Jerry Muckensturm OLB; 51 Mel Rogers OLB; 57 Don Rives MLB; Defensive backs (DB): 43 Craig Clemons SS; 48 Allan Ellis CB; 45 Gary Fencik SS; 24 Virgil Livers CB; 46 Doug Plank FS; 47 Mike Spivey CB; 44 Terry Schmidt CB/S; 23 Len Walterscheid FS; Special teams (ST): 86 Bob Parsons P; 16 Bob Thomas K	Reserve: 79 Lionel Antoine T (IR); 84 Brian Baschnagel WR (IR); 60 Wally Chambers DT (IR); 71 Roger Stillwell DE (IR); Rookies in italics

== Regular season ==
=== Schedule ===
Week	Date	Opponent	Result	Record	Venue	Attendance
1	September 18	**Detroit Lions**	**W** 30–20	1–0	Soldier Field	51,530
2	September 25	at St. Louis Cardinals	**L** 13–16	1–1	Busch Memorial Stadium	49,878
3	October 2	New Orleans Saints	**L** 24–42	1–2	Soldier Field	51,488
4	October 10	Los Angeles Rams	**W** 24–23	2–2	Soldier Field	51,412
5	October 16	at **Minnesota Vikings**	**L** 16–22 (OT)	2–3	Metropolitan Stadium	47,708
6	October 23	Atlanta Falcons	**L** 10–16	2–4	Soldier Field	49,407
7	October 30	at **Green Bay Packers**	**W** 26–0	3–4	Lambeau Field	56,002
8	November 6	at Houston Oilers	**L** 0–47	3–5	Houston Astrodome	47,226
9	November 13	Kansas City Chiefs	**W** 28–27	4–5	Soldier Field	49,543
10	November 20	**Minnesota Vikings**	**W** 10–7	5–5	Soldier Field	49,563
11	November 24	at **Detroit Lions**	**W** 31–14	6–5	Pontiac Silverdome	71,373
12	December 4	at **Tampa Bay Buccaneers**	**W** 10–0	7–5	Tampa Stadium	48,948
13	December 11	**Green Bay Packers**	**W** 21–10	8–5	Soldier Field	33,557
14	December 18	at New York Giants	**W** 12–9 (OT)	9–5	Giants Stadium	50,152
Note: Intra-division opponents are in **bold** text.

=== Playoffs ===
Round	Date	Opponent	Result	Record	Venue	Attendance
Divisional	December 26	at Dallas Cowboys	**L** 7–37	0–1	Texas Stadium	62,920

=== Game summaries ===
==== Week 1 ====
Team	1	2	3	4	Total
Lions	7	3	3	7	20
• **Bears**	7	20	0	3	30

- Date: September 18
- Location: Soldier Field • Chicago, Illinois
- Game start: 1:00 p.m.
- Game attendance: 51,530
- Game weather: 73 °F (23 °C) • Wind 8 mph (13 km/h)
- TV announcers (CBS): Gary Bender, Tom Matte

Scoring summary
1	DET	Dexter Bussey 1-yard run (Steve Mike-Mayer kick)	Lions 7–0
1	CHI	Johnny Musso 2-yard run (Bob Thomas kick)	Tie 7–7
2	CHI	Steve Schubert 70-yard punt return (Bob Thomas kick)	Bears 14–7
2	CHI	Walter Payton 3-yard run (kick failed)	Bears 20–7
2	CHI	Walter Payton 2-yard run (Bob Thomas kick)	Bears 27–7
2	DET	Steve Mike-Mayer 35-yard field goal	Bears 27–10
3	DET	Steve Mike-Mayer 38-yard field goal	Bears 27–13
4	DET	Dexter Bussey 5-yard run (Steve Mike-Mayer kick)	Bears 27–20
4	CHI	Bob Thomas 35-yard field goal	Bears 30–20

==== Week 2 ====
Week 2: Chicago Bears at St. Louis Cardinals

Quarter	1	2	3	4	Total
Bears	3	0	3	7	**13**
**Cardinals**	3	10	3	0	**16**

at Busch Memorial Stadium, St. Louis, Missouri

- Date: September 25, 1977
- Game time: 1:00 p.m. CST
- Game weather: Overcast, 68 °F (20 °C)
- TV announcers (CBS): Frank Glieber and Johnny Morris

Game information

**First quarter**

**Second quarter**

**Third quarter**

**Fourth quarter**

Top passers

- CHI – Bob Avellini – 18/37, 177 yards, 1 TD, 2 INT
- STL – Jim Hart – 16/24, 215 yards, 1 TD, 2 INT

Top rushers

- CHI – Roland Harper – 14 rushes, 65 yards
- STL – Jim Otis – 20 rushes, 64 yards

Top receivers

- CHI – James Scott – 5 receptions, 64 yards
- STL – Mel Gray – 5 receptions, 95 yards

Jim Hart completed 12 straight passes, one of 10 yards for a second-quarter touchdown, while directing St. Louis to victory over Chicago 16–13. The veteran Hart who completed 16 of 24 passes while suffering two interceptions, contributed balance to a crisp Cards attack and Jim Bakken booted three field goals.

==== Week 3 vs New Orleans Saints ====
Week 3: New Orleans Saints at Chicago Bears

Quarter	1	2	3	4	Total
**Saints**	7	14	14	14	**49**
Bears	7	3	0	14	**24**

at Soldier Field, Chicago, Illinois

- Date: October 2, 1977
- Game time: 12:00 p.m. CST
- Game weather: Overcast, 56 °F (13 °C)
- TV announcers (CBS): Don Criqui and Emerson Boozer

Game information

**First quarter**

**Second quarter**

**Third quarter**

**Fourth quarter**

Top passers

- NO – Archie Manning – 8/17, 168 yards, TD
- CHI – Bob Avellini – 18/38, 238 yards, TD, 2 INT

Top rushers

- NO – Tony Galbreath – 21 rushes, 61 yards
- CHI – Walter Payton – 19 rushes, 140 yards, 2 TD

Top receivers

- NO – Jim Thaxton – 3 receptions, 63 yards
- CHI – Bo Rather – 6 receptions, 113 yards

Archie Manning scored on runs of 8, 2 and 11 and threw a 35-yard Touchdown pass to Chuck Muncie as the Saints gain a road victory. The Saints also got TDs on a 52-yard fumble recovery by Bob Pollard and a 57-yard interception return by Jim Merlo.

==== Week 4 ====
Team	1	2	3	4	Total
Rams	13	3	0	7	23
• Bears	7	7	0	10	24

- Date: October 10
- Location: Soldier Field, Chicago, Illinois
- Game start: 8:00 p.m. CDT
- TV announcers (ABC): Frank Gifford and Don Meredith

Scoring summary
1	LA	Rafael Septien 22 yard field goal	Rams 3–0
1	LA	Rafael Septien 29 yard field goal	Rams 6–0
1	LA	Lawrence McCutcheon 2 yard run (Rafael Septien kick)	Rams 13–0
1	CHI	James Scott 70 yard pass from Bob Avellini (Bob Thomas kick)	Rams 13–7
2	CHI	James Scott 72 yard pass from Bob Avellini (Bob Thomas kick)	Bears 14–13
2	LA	Rafael Septien 24 yard field goal	Rams 16–14
4	CHI	Bob Thomas 33 yard field goal	Bears 17–16
4	CHI	Greg Latta 29 yard pass from Bob Avellini (Bob Thomas kick)	Bears 24–16
4	LA	Dwight Scales 26 yard pass from Pat Haden (Rafael Septien kick)	Bears 24–23

==== Week 6 ====
- Soldier Field in Chicago, Illinois
- TV Station: CBS
- Announcers: Vin Scully, Alex Hawkins

With about two minutes to go, Chicago appeared to have a one-point victory over Atlanta. But the Bears' Steve Schubert fumbled a punt deep in his own territory, Atlanta recovered and Haskel Stanback plowed in moments later from the two-yard line for the Falcons victory. Chicago had taken a 3–0 lead on Bob Thomas' 40-yard field goal, but Nick Mike-Mayer come back with shots of 32, 44, and 21 yards to put Atlanta ahead 9–3. Brian Baschnagel's 84-yard kickoff return resulted in the Bears only touchdown.

==== Week 7 ====
Week 7: Chicago Bears at Green Bay Packers

Quarter	1	2	3	4	Total
**Bears**	13	3	0	10	**26**
Packers	0	0	0	0	**0**

at Lambeau Field, Green Bay, Wisconsin

- Date: October 30, 1977
- Game time: 1:00 p.m. CST
- Game weather: Overcast, 45 °F (7 °C)
- TV announcers (CBS): Gary Bender and Johnny Morris

Game information

**First quarter**

**Second quarter**

**Third quarter**

**Fourth quarter**

Top passers

- CHI – Bob Avellini – 4/9, 54 yards, TD, INT
- GB – Lynn Dickey – 10/25, 96 yards, INT

Top rushers

- CHI – Walter Payton – 23 rushes, 205 yards, 2 TDs
- GB – Barty Smith – 15 rushes, 54 yards

Top receivers

- CHI – Greg Latta – 3 receptions, 49 yards
- GB – Ollie Smith – 3 receptions, 57 yards

Walter Payton's 205 tied Gale Sayers record for most rushing yards in a game that was set in 1968. "I didn't want to break Sayers' record because Sayers is a super guy. What's a record? I just want to win the game" Payton said it after scoring touchdown runs of 1 and 6 and setting up Johnny Musso's 3-yard touchdown run in a rout over the Packers.

==== Week 8 ====
- The Astrodome in Houston, Texas
- TV Station: CBS
- Announcers: Frank Glieber and Johnny Morris

Houston's big play offense, dormant throughout the season sprang to life on touchdown bombs of 85 and 43 yards to Ken Burrough and a 75-yard free kick return and a 61-yard touchdown run by Billy Johnson as the Oilers dazzled Chicago 47–0. Houston's first two big plays, Johnson's run and Burrough's 85-yarder we're delivered over a span of 2:55 in the second quarter and helped the Oilers to a 17–0 halftime lead and never looked back. Coach Jack Pardee call the loss "The worst thing I've ever been associated with in any form". This loss turns out to be a turning point in the Bears season. They would not lose a game again in the 1977 regular season.

==== Week 10 ====
Quarter	1	2	3	4	Total
Vikings	0	0	7	0	**7**
**Bears**	0	10	0	0	**10**

at Soldier Field, Chicago, Illinois

- Date: Sunday, November 20
- Game time: 12:00 p.m.
- Game weather: 48 °F (9 °C), wind 21 mph (34 km/h)
- Game attendance: 49,563
- Pro-Football-Reference.com

Game information

**Second quarter**

- CHI – Walter Payton 1-yard run (Bob Thomas kick) – **Bears 7–0**
- CHI – Bob Thomas 37-yard field goal – **Bears 10–0**

**Third quarter**

- MIN – Matt Blair 10-yard blocked punt return (Fred Cox kick) – **Bears 10–7**

**Vikings**

- Bob Lee
  12/24, 116 Yds, 2 INT
- Chuck Foreman
  14 Rush, 54 Yds
- Sammy White
  3 Rec, 31 Yds

**Bears**

- Bob Avellini
  4/6, 33 Yds, INT
- Walter Payton
  40 Rush, 275 Yds, TD
- James Scott
  2 Rec, 22 Yds

==== Week 11 ====
Team	1	2	3	4	Total
• Bears	0	0	17	14	31
Lions	0	7	0	7	14

- Date: November 24
- Location: Pontiac Silverdome, Pontiac, MI
- Game start: 1:30 p.m. EST
- Game attendance: 71,373
- Game weather: Indoors (dome)

Scoring summary
Q2	DET	Hill 16 yard pass from Landry (Mike-Mayer kick)	DET 7–0
Q3	CHI	Rather 42 yard pass from Avellini (Thomas kick)	Tie 7–7
Q3	CHI	Payton 75 yard pass from Avellini (Thomas kick)	CHI 14–7
Q3	CHI	Thomas 29 yard field goal	CHI 17–7
Q4	CHI	Avellini 1 yard run (Thomas kick)	CHI 24–7
Q4	DET	O'Neil 52 yard fumble return (Mike-Mayer kick)	CHI 24–14
Q4	CHI	Payton 8 yard run (Thomas kick)	CHI 31–14

- Walter Payton 20 Rush, 137 Yds, 4 Rec, 107 Yds

=== Standings ===
NFC Central
	W	L	T	PCT	DIV	CONF	PF	PA	STK
Minnesota Vikings^{(3)}	9	5	0	.643	6–1	8–4	231	227	W1
Chicago Bears^{(4)}	9	5	0	.643	6–1	8–4	255	253	W6
Detroit Lions	6	8	0	.429	2–5	4–8	183	252	L1
Green Bay Packers	4	10	0	.286	2–5	4–7	134	219	W1
Tampa Bay Buccaneers	2	12	0	.143	0–4	2–11	103	223	W2

== Postseason ==
=== NFC Divisional Playoff ===
Dallas Cowboys 37, Chicago Bears 7

Quarter	1	2	3	4	Total
Bears	0	0	0	7	7
Cowboys	7	10	17	3	37

at Texas Stadium, Irving, Texas

- Game time: 1:00 p.m. CST
- Game weather: 49 °F (9 °C), mostly cloudy
- Game attendance: 62,920
- Referee: Gordon McCarter
- TV announcers (CBS): Pat Summerall and Tom Brookshier

Safety Charlie Waters led the Cowboys to a 37–7 victory by setting an NFL playoff record of 3 interceptions. Dallas built a 17–0 halftime lead, with the aid of running back Doug Dennison’s 2-yard touchdown run and quarterback Roger Staubach’s 28-yard scoring pass to tight end Billy Joe Dupree. In the second half, running back Tony Dorsett recorded two rushing touchdowns and Efren Herrera added two more field goals. The Bears were limited to 224 total yards and did not score until the fourth quarter when the game was already out of reach.

== Awards and records ==
- Walter Payton, NFL MVP
- Walter Payton, led NFL in rushing (1,852 yards)
- Walter Payton, Pro Bowl Most Valuable Player
- Walter Payton, Led NFL in Total Yards, (2,216)
