= Richard Wood (American football) =

American football player (born 1953)

No. 58, 54
- Position: Linebacker

Personal information
- Born: May 31, 1953 (age 73); Elizabeth, New Jersey, U.S.
- Listed height: 6 ft 2 in (1.88 m)
- Listed weight: 224 lb (102 kg)

Career information
- High school: Thomas Jefferson (Elizabeth)
- College: USC
- NFL draft: 1975: 3rd round, 68th overall pick

Career history
- New York Jets (1975); Tampa Bay Buccaneers (1976–1984); Jacksonville Bulls (1985)

Awards and highlights
- 2× National champion (1972, 1974); 2× Consensus All-American (1973, 1974); First-team All-American (1972); 3× First-team All-Pac-8 (1972, 1973, 1974)

Career NFL statistics
- Games played - started: 146–94
- Interceptions: 9
- Fumble recoveries: 6
- Stats at Pro Football Reference
- College Football Hall of Fame

Richard Marlon Wood (born May 31, 1953) is an American former professional football player who was a linebacker for the New York Jets and Tampa Bay Buccaneers of the National Football League (NFL). He played college football for the USC Trojans, earning All-American honors. Wood was the team captain and leading tackler of the Buccaneers' early teams, coached by John McKay.

Wood became a coach in the NFL, International leagues, college and in high school.

== Early life ==
Wood played high school football for Thomas Jefferson High School in Elizabeth, New Jersey.

== College career ==
Wood attended the University of Southern California as a student and football player. There he was a three-time All-American for the Trojans during the 1972–74 seasons. The Trojans football team won two National Championships during Wood's years there. He was a modest-sized player for an NCAA Football Bowl Subdivision (formerly NCAA Division I-A) linebacker, but made up for his lack of size with lightning speed, stamina, and hard-hitting tackles.

His trademark Batman "band of black" painted across his nose and around both eyes, as those eyes peered out from his helmet, was celebrated by his teammates, the sports press, and Trojan football fans, and they were a gesture to intimidate opponent's linemen and running backs.

Wood came to the varsity as a sophomore in 1972, and he not only led the undefeated Trojans in tackles, but also surpassed the total of his closest teammate by 30 tackles. He was given the responsibility of calling his team's defensive signals.

Wood had five interceptions, returning one for a touchdown and he deflected four other passes. For his efforts, he gained first-team All-American honors. In his junior year he once again led U.S.C. to a conference title and another trip to the Rose Bowl Game. He was a consensus All-American in 1973. In 1974, Wood was part of his second victorious Rose Bowl team and national championship team. He repeated as a consensus All-American honoree. While at U.S.C. the Trojans had a 31-3-2 won-loss-tied record.

In 2007, Wood was inducted into the College Football Hall of Fame.

== Professional career ==
Wood was selected by the New York Jets in the third round of the 1975 NFL draft, but experienced a difficult rookie season. He also had trouble fitting into a Jets locker room atmosphere that he considered to be cold and unfriendly. A preseason trade to the expansion Tampa Bay Buccaneers reunited him with his former U.S.C. coach, John McKay, and placed him in a more favorable situation. With the Buccaneers, he became a key player on one of the league's best defensive units. After moving into the starting lineup during the 1976 season, he started 88 consecutive games before being replaced by Scot Brantley in 1982. He averaged 136 tackles per season as a starter, and his single-game high of 18 tackles remains tied as the team record. As of 2012, he ranks sixth all-time among Buccaneer defenders with 855 career tackles. His two defensive touchdowns in 1977, one of which occurred during the franchise's first victory, established a franchise record that stood until 1990. With Ronde Barber and Derrick Brooks, he is one of three Buccaneers to have scored on both a fumble and an interception return in the same season. Wood was captain of the 1979 squad that advanced to the NFC Championship game.

When the new head coach Leeman Bennett declined to renew his contract in 1985, Wood joined the new USFL Jacksonville Bulls team, where he was considered one of the league's most important signings.

== Coaching ==
Wood returned to the Buccaneers in 1991 as an assistant defensive coach under head coaches Richard Williamson and Sam Wyche. Wood was fired by Wyche after the 1993 season, but he returned to serve as an honorary captain for the coin toss of the NFC Championship Game that resulted in their appearance in Super Bowl XXXVII.

He served as the head coach with Amsterdam Crusaders in the Netherlands (1994) and the head coach of the German Football League Munich Cowboys (1997) before taking the head coaching position at Tampa's Paul R. Wharton High School in 1998. He coached that team to the state final game in the sixth year of its existence. In 2003, Wood accepted a position as the defensive line coach with the Frankfurt Galaxy of NFL Europe, where he coached in two world bowl games and coached several players who went on to play in the NFL. As of 2012, he is an assistant coach at Tampa Catholic High School.

== Personal life ==
His brother, Jake Wood, played Major League Baseball from 1961 to 1967 with the Detroit Tigers and the Cincinnati Reds.

Wood holds a black belt in Tae Kwon Do.

A drummer, Wood occasionally performed in The Fifth Quarter, a band composed of Buccaneer teammates.

Wood and Brantley have both been assisted by Gay Culverhouse, in her efforts to get recognition for the problem of football-related dementia. He suffers from [headaches] occasionally also, and has been involved in litigation with the NFL disability board, who have denied medical benefits despite his having required surgery to insert a metal rod into his spine. Wood's post-football life has been characterized by financial hardship, as part of his NFL earnings were lost to corrupt advisors.
