= Japan Bowl =

College football all-star game

Japan Bowl (defunct)
- ジャパンボウル
- Stadium: National Stadium (1976–1979); Yokohama Stadium (1980–1991); Tokyo Dome (1992–1993)
- Location: Tokyo (1976–79, 1992–93); Yokohama (1980–91)
- Operated: 1976–1993

The Japan Bowl (in Japanese, ジャパンボウル) was a post-season college football all-star game played in Japan each January from 1976 to 1993, which showcased East and West all-star teams made up of college football players from the United States.

== History ==
The first game was played in 1976 in Tokyo, to a crowd of 68,000 spectators. After being played at National Stadium for four years, the game moved to Yokohama in 1980, where it was played at Yokohama Stadium through 1991. The final two game were held at Tokyo Dome in 1992 and 1993.

From 1983 through 1989, the game was sponsored by Ricoh and was known as the Ricoh Japan Bowl.

The bowl featured various famous participants, including Heisman Trophy winners Bo Jackson and Ty Detmer, who both received MVP awards. College Football Hall of Fame coach Lou Holtz led the East team in the 1976 game, and Super Bowl XLIV champion Mark Brunell won the final MVP award in 1993.

The 1977 game featured California quarterback Joe Roth, who was fighting a battle with melanoma. The Japan Bowl ended up being the final football game of Roth's career; he died just a month after the game in February at the age of 21.

Several unrelated football games have been informally referred to as the "Japan Bowl", such as the 1993 Coca-Cola Classic, the 1994 Ivy Bowl, and some of the NFL's American Bowl games.

== Game results ==
No.	Date†	Winner		Loser		Venue‡	Attendance	Ref.
1	January 18, 1976	West	27	East	18	National Stadium	68,000	
2	January 16, 1977	West	21	East	10	National Stadium	58,000	
3	January 14, 1978	East	26	West	10	National Stadium	32,500	
4	January 14, 1979	East	33	West	14	National Stadium	55,000	
5	January 13, 1980	West	28	East	17	Yokohama Stadium	27,000	
6	January 18, 1981	West	25	East	13	Yokohama Stadium	30,000	
7	January 17, 1982	West	28	East	17	Yokohama Stadium	28,000	
8	January 23, 1983	West	30	East	21	Yokohama Stadium	30,000	
9	January 16, 1984	West	26	East	21	Yokohama Stadium	26,000	
10	January 13, 1985	West	28	East	14	Yokohama Stadium	30,000	
11	January 12, 1986	East	31	West	14	Yokohama Stadium	30,000	
12	January 11, 1987	West	24	East	17	Yokohama Stadium	30,000	
13	January 10, 1988	West	17	East	3	Yokohama Stadium	30,000	
14	January 15, 1989	East	30	West	7	Yokohama Stadium	29,000	
15	January 13, 1990	East	24	West	10	Yokohama Stadium	27,000	
16	January 12, 1991	West	20	East	14	Yokohama Stadium	30,000	
17	January 11, 1992	East	14	West	13	Tokyo Dome	50,000	
18	January 10, 1993	East	27	West	13	Tokyo Dome	46,000	

The West team won 11 games, while the East team won 7 games.
† NCAA records and contemporary news reports sometimes cite different game dates, likely due to differing time zones.
‡ NCAA records incorrectly list all games as having been played in Yokohama.

== MVPs ==
Joe Roth Memorial Award

Following the 1977 appearance of Joe Roth – an All-American quarterback from Cal who was suffering from melanoma, which would lead to his death weeks after playing in the game – the game's MVP recognition was given as the Joe Roth Memorial Award. The trophy is topped by Roth's helmet. The first recipient was Jimmy Cefalo of Penn State in 1978.

Year	MVP	Team	Pos.
1976	Chuck Muncie	Cal	RB
1977	Robin Earl	Washington	RB/TE
1978	Jimmy Cefalo	Penn State	RB
1979	Scott Fitzkee	Penn State	RB
1980	Paul Campbell	Ohio State	RB
1981	J. C. Watts	Oklahoma	QB
1982	Leo Wisniewski	Penn State	OL
1983	Richard Neely	SMU	DL
1984	Irving Fryar	Nebraska	WR
1985	Gale Gilbert	Cal	QB
1986	Bo Jackson	Auburn	RB
1987	Troy Stradford	Boston College	RB
1988	Chad Hennings	Air Force	DL
1989	Mark Messner	Michigan	DL
1990	Anthony Thompson	Indiana	RB
1991	Bill Musgrave	Oregon	QB
1992	Ty Detmer	BYU	QB
1993	Mark Brunell	Washington	QB

== See also ==
- List of college bowl games
