= Robin Earl =

American football player (born 1955)

No. 39, 81, 89
- Positions: Running back, tight end

Personal information
- Born: March 18, 1955 (age 71); Boise, Idaho, U.S.
- Listed height: 6 ft 4 in (1.93 m)
- Listed weight: 205 lb (93 kg)

Career information
- High school: Kent-Meridian (Kent, Washington)
- College: Washington
- NFL draft: 1977: 3rd round, 61st overall pick

Career history
- Chicago Bears (1977–1983); Birmingham Stallions (1984–1985)

Awards and highlights
- Japan Bowl MVP (1977); 3× Second-team All-Pac-8 (1974, 1975, 1976)

Career NFL statistics
- Rushing attempts-yards: 94-382
- Receptions-yards: 47-486
- Touchdowns: 5
- Stats at Pro Football Reference

Robin Danial Earl (born March 18, 1955) is an American former professional football player was a full back and tight end for seven season with the Chicago Bears of the National Football League (NFL). from 1977 to 1983. He played college football for the Washington Huskies. He also played professional with the Birmingham Stallions (1984–1985) of the United States Football League (USFL).

== Early life ==
Earl starred as a tailback at Kent-Meridian High School in Kent, Washington, southeast of Seattle, despite his 6 ft 5 in (1.96 m) 242 lb (110 kg) frame more typical of a lineman or tight-end. In his senior season of 1972, Earl was voted the state's MVP both on offense and defense, and was also named Washington's Top Scholastic Athlete of the Year. That spring he won the state title in the discus, and his toss of 192 ft 7 in (58.70 m) still stands as K-M's all time mark.

== College career ==
At the University of Washington in Seattle, Earl started as a tight end as a freshman in 1973, but once again he proved valuable when switched to fullback for his final two and a half seasons. He lettered all four years and finished as the Huskies' second all-time leading rusher with 2,351 yards. Voted Most Improved Player after the 1974 season, Earl was a team captain and MVP as a senior in 1976. He also lettered three years in track and field as a discus thrower, and qualified for the NCAA Track Championships all three seasons (1974–76).

== Professional career ==
Robin Earl was selected in the third round of the 1977 NFL draft by the Chicago Bears. He played fullback, blocking for Walter Payton for three years before being switched once again to tight end, then finished his nine-year career with the Birmingham Stallions of the USFL.

After football, Earl licensed in the state of Illinois (1986) as an Insurance Broker specializing in employee benefits. In 2009, Earl licensed with the Illinois Commerce Commission to sell energy and founded 'Save On Energy 81'. His company currently sells electricity to hundreds of Illinois residences and businesses. In 2014 Earl moved back to the Seattle area and joined the 'Assurance Group' specializing in Medicare sales. In November 2021, Earl, who is now semi-retired, moved to the Southern Tucson, Az. area where he still maintains his Insurance & Energy Broker's License.

== Currently ==
Robin and his wife Jill Everhart Earl were married on November 11, 2021. Both are strong Conservative Christians. Robin has seven children: Ryan, Regan, Roth, Robin, Kristin, Preston and Kevin. 8 Grand Kids and one Great Grandson. Jill has three adult daughters: Ginger, Jasmine and Julie.

They reside at a retirement community (Quail Creek) south of Tucson in Green Valley, Arizona.
