= Marvin Cobb =

American football player (born 1953)

No. 24, 26, 25
- Position: Safety

Personal information
- Born: August 6, 1953 (age 73); Detroit, Michigan, U.S.
- Listed height: 6 ft 0 in (1.83 m)
- Listed weight: 189 lb (86 kg)

Career information
- High school: Notre Dame (Riverside, California)
- College: USC
- NFL draft: 1975: 11th round, 276th overall pick

Career history
- Cincinnati Bengals (1975–1979); Pittsburgh Steelers (1980); Minnesota Vikings (1980)

Awards and highlights
- 2× National champion (1972, 1974); Third-team All-American (1974); First-team All-Pac-8 (1974)

Career NFL statistics
- Interceptions: 13
- Fumble recoveries: 3
- Defensive TDs: 1
- Stats at Pro Football Reference

Marvin Lawrence Cobb (born August 6, 1953) is an American former professional football player who was a safety in the National Football League (NFL). He was selected 276th overall by the Cincinnati Bengals in the 11th round of the 1975 NFL draft. He played high school football at Notre Dame High School in Riverside, California, and college football for the USC Trojans, where he also played shortstop on the baseball team. With USC, Cobb played on 2 College World Series champion baseball teams (1973 and 1974) and 2 National Champion football teams (1972 and 1974).

Cobb played 5 seasons for the Bengals, from 1975 to 1979. During those five years he played in 71 games, starting 54 and making 13 interceptions, playing as both a free safety and strong safety. He also served as a kick returner occasionally, returning five punts and one kickoff between 1975 and 1977. In 1977, he also got to play a little on offense. In a game against the San Diego Chargers on October 2, Cobb threw an incomplete pass. In a Monday Night Football game against the Pittsburgh Steelers on October 17, Cobb got one rushing attempt but did not gain any yardage. Cobb also played for the Steelers and Minnesota Vikings, splitting eight games between the two teams in 1980. He also served as a kick returner for the Steelers.

In 1986, Cobb became an assistant athletic director at USC. Cobb was outspoken about the fact that black athletes at USC were graduating at a lower rate than white students and he did not see anything being done to assist those students. After Cobb was denied a promotion in 1990 or 1991, he sued the university for racial discrimination and breach of contract, saying that the university denied the promotion because his advocacy for its black athletes. USC was represented by Johnnie Cochran, who later represented O. J. Simpson in his murder trial and in a turn of events similar to an issue in that trial, it was revealed that some USC employees had suggested framing Cobb for a fake drug bust. Cobb was eventually awarded $1.1 million.

Cobb has also been active in raising awareness of the impact football injuries can have on players later in life. He has also been active in attempting to increase pension and medical benefits for former players. He became a director of the Independent Retired Players Summit. He is also president of the Retired NFL Players Congress.
