= 1974 Washington Huskies football team =

American college football season

1974 Washington Huskies football
- Conference: Pacific-8 Conference
- Record: 5–6 (3–4 Pac-8)
- Head coach: Jim Owens (18th season)
- MVP: Cornelius Chenevert
- Captains: Willie Hendricks; Bob Martin; Dave Pear; Ray Pinney
- Home stadium: Husky Stadium

1974 Pacific-8 Conference football standings
	Conf.					Overall
Team	W		L		T	W		L		T
No. 2 USC $	6	–	0	–	1	10	–	1	–	1
Stanford	5	–	1	–	1	5	–	4	–	2
California	4	–	2	–	1	7	–	3	–	1
UCLA	4	–	2	–	1	6	–	3	–	2
Washington	3	–	4	–	0	5	–	6	–	0
Oregon State	3	–	4	–	0	3	–	8	–	0
Washington State	1	–	6	–	0	2	–	9	–	0
Oregon	0	–	7	–	0	2	–	9	–	0
$ – Conference champion; Rankings from AP Poll

The 1974 Washington Huskies football team was an American football team that represented the University of Washington during the 1974 NCAA Division I football season. In its 18th and final season under head coach Jim Owens, the team compiled a 5–6 record (3–4 in the Pacific-8 Conference, tied for fifth), and was outscored 285 to 272.

Linebacker Cornelius Chenevert was selected as the team's most valuable player, and the team captains were Willie Hendricks, Bob Martin, Dave Pear, and Ray Pinney. Days after the season concluded with an Apple Cup victory at Spokane, 47-year-old Owens stepped down as head coach, and Don James succeeded him in December.

== Schedule ==
Date	Opponent	Site	Result	Attendance	Source
September 14	Cincinnati*	Husky Stadium; Seattle, WA	W 21–17	47,000	
September 21	Iowa State*	Husky Stadium; Seattle, WA	W 31–28	47,500	
September 28	No. 9 Texas A&M*	Husky Stadium; Seattle, WA	L 15–28	54,000	
October 5	at No. 19 Texas*	Texas Memorial Stadium; Austin, TX	L 21–35	50,250	
October 12	at Oregon State	Parker Stadium; Corvallis, OR	L 9–23	26,951	
October 19	at Stanford	Stanford Stadium; Stanford, CA	L 17–34	38,000	
October 26	Oregon	Husky Stadium; Seattle, WA (rivalry)	W 66–0	52,500	
November 2	No. 18 UCLA	Husky Stadium; Seattle, WA	W 31–9	52,000	
November 9	No. 18 California	Husky Stadium; Seattle, WA	L 26–52	54,500	
November 16	at No. 8 USC	Los Angeles Memorial Coliseum; Los Angeles, CA	L 11–42	51,157	
November 23	at Washington State	Joe Albi Stadium; Spokane, WA (Apple Cup)	W 24–17	27,800	
*Non-conference game; Rankings from AP Poll released prior to the game

== Roster ==
1974 Washington Huskies football team roster
Players
Coaches
Offense

Pos.	#	Name	Class
QB	13	Chris Rowland	Jr
QB	14	Dennis Fitzpatrick	Sr
SE	47	Jim Anderson	Jr
TE	87	Paul Bianchini	Jr
SE	89	Reggie Brown	Sr
SE	20	Ken Conley	Jr
SE	39	Fred Dean	Sr
TE, FB	99	Robin Earl	So
RB	32	Willie Hendricks (C)	Jr
G	66	Charles Jackson	So
SE	91	Scott Phillips	So
C	59	Ray Pinney (C)	Jr
G	67	Lou Quinn	Jr
OT	65	Eddie Ray	Jr
OT	79	Carl Van Valkenburg	So
RB	24	Mike Vicino	Jr
OT	71	Don Wardlow	So

Defense

Pos.	#	Name	Class
WS	18	Al Burleson	Jr
LB	56	Cornelius Chenevert	Jr
LB	53	Rob Gehring	Jr
DT	73	Mike Green	Jr
CB	4	Pedro Hawkins	Jr
LB	48	Jim Kristof	Sr
SS	22	Steve Lipe	Jr
LB	50	Dan Lloyd	Jr
DE	95	Bob Martin (C)	Sr
DT	80	Dave Pear (C)	Sr
CB	28	Frank Reed	Jr
DT	86	Eugene Sanders
DE	92	Paul Strohmeier	Jr
DE	70	Dee Washington

Special teams

Pos.	#	Name	Class
P	3	Skip Boyd	Sr
K	7	Steve Robbins	Fr

Head coach

- Jim Owens (18th year)

Coordinators/assistant coaches

Legend

- (C) Team captain
- (S) Suspended
- (I) Ineligible
- Injured
- Redshirt

== NFL draft selections ==
Three University of Washington Huskies were selected in the 1975 NFL draft, which lasted 17 rounds with 442 selections.

= Husky Hall of Fame

Player	Position	Round	Pick	Franchise
Dave Pear	Defensive tackle	3rd	56	Baltimore Colts
Bob Martin	Defensive end	11th	269	Green Bay Packers
Skip Boyd	Punter	17th	438	Los Angeles Rams
