= Danny Reece =

American football player (born 1955)

No. 46
- Position: Defensive back

Personal information
- Born: January 28, 1955 (age 71); San Pedro, California, U.S.
- Listed height: 5 ft 11 in (1.80 m)
- Listed weight: 190 lb (86 kg)

Career information
- High school: Phineas Banning (Wilmington, California)
- College: USC
- NFL draft: 1976: 3rd round, 69th overall pick

Career history
- Tampa Bay Buccaneers (1976–1980)

Awards and highlights
- 2× National champion (1972, 1974); 2× First-team All-Pac-8 (1974, 1975); Second-team All-Pac-8 (1973)

Career NFL statistics
- Interceptions: 1
- Fumble recoveries: 5
- Defensive touchdowns: 1
- Stats at Pro Football Reference

Danny Reece (born January 28, 1955) is an American former professional football player who was a cornerback in the National Football League (NFL). He played college football for the USC Trojans.

Daniel Reece Jr., his son is a former professional fighter. After starting his fight career at The University of Nevada, Las Vegas with their boxing team, where he was a two time western regional champion and the 2006 national champion in the welterweight division, Daniel turned professional. He was undefeated in seven professional bouts before an eye injury forced him into an early retirement in 2010. He returned to the fight game in 2012, this time competing as a mixed martial artist. His MMA career was also short lived as the same eye injury that had forced his retirement from boxing led to his loss of vision in one eye and subsequent second retirement.

== Early life ==
Danny grew up with 8 siblings—5 brothers and 3 sisters, most of them younger. Prior to USC, Reece prepped at Banning High School in Wilmington, California. His brothers also played collegiate football, but Danny was the only one who played professionally. His father, Lloyd Reece, served on the USS Arizona during the bombing of Pearl Harbor and played professional baseball for the Kansas City Monarchs. Lloyd Reece died in October 2004.

== College career ==
Reece was a third-round draft choice from the University of Southern California by the Cincinnati Bengals in the 1976 NFL draft.

== Professional career ==
Reece played for the Tampa Bay Buccaneers between 1976 and 1980, where he would score the first ever touchdown in franchise history on a fumble return against the Baltimore Colts in Week 4. Reece led the National Football League in punt returns in 1979 and 1980.
