= Geoff Reece =

American football player (born 1952)

No. 54, 55
- Position: Center

Personal information
- Born: May 16, 1952 (age 74); Everett, Washington, U.S.
- Listed height: 6 ft 4 in (1.93 m)
- Listed weight: 247 lb (112 kg)

Career information
- High school: Cascade (Everett)
- College: Washington State
- NFL draft: 1975: 3rd round, 61st overall pick

Career history
- Los Angeles Rams (1976); Seattle Seahawks (1977); Baltimore Colts (1978)

Awards and highlights
- First-team All-American (1974); 2× First-team All-Pac-8 (1973, 1974)
- Stats at Pro Football Reference

Geoffrey Robert Reece (born May 16, 1952) is an American former professional football player. He played as a center in three National Football League (NFL) seasons from 1976 to 1978 for the Los Angeles Rams, Seattle Seahawks, and Baltimore Colts.

Born and raised in Everett, Washington, Reece graduated from its Cascade High School, and played college football at Washington State University in Pullman under head coach Jim Sweeney. He was all-conference twice in the Pacific-8, and All-American as a senior. After the 1974 season, Reece played in the Blue-Gray Game, East-West Shrine Game, and the Senior Bowl. He was inducted into the WSU athletics hall of fame in 2015.

Selected 61st overall in the third round of the 1975 NFL draft by the Rams, a knee injury in the College All-Star Game on August 1 sidelined Reece for his rookie season in 1975.
