= 1974 UCLA Bruins football team =

American college football season

1974 UCLA Bruins football
- Conference: Pacific-8 Conference
- Record: 6–3–2 (4–2–1 Pac-8)
- Head coach: Dick Vermeil (1st season)
- Offensive coordinator: Rod Dowhower (1st season)
- Defensive coordinator: Lynn Stiles (1st season)
- Home stadium: Los Angeles Memorial Coliseum

1974 Pacific-8 Conference football standings
	Conf.					Overall
Team	W		L		T	W		L		T
No. 2 USC $	6	–	0	–	1	10	–	1	–	1
Stanford	5	–	1	–	1	5	–	4	–	2
California	4	–	2	–	1	7	–	3	–	1
UCLA	4	–	2	–	1	6	–	3	–	2
Washington	3	–	4	–	0	5	–	6	–	0
Oregon State	3	–	4	–	0	3	–	8	–	0
Washington State	1	–	6	–	0	2	–	9	–	0
Oregon	0	–	7	–	0	2	–	9	–	0
$ – Conference champion; Rankings from AP Poll

The 1974 UCLA Bruins football team represented the University of California, Los Angeles during the 1974 NCAA Division I football season. Members of the Pacific-8 Conference, the Bruins were led by first-year head coach Dick Vermeil and played their home games at the Los Angeles Memorial Coliseum.

== Schedule ==
Date	Opponent	Rank	Site	TV	Result	Attendance	Source
September 7	at No. 16 Tennessee*	No. 12	Neyland Stadium; Knoxville, TN	ABC	T 17–17	57,560	
September 21	at Iowa*	No. 12	Kinnick Stadium; Iowa City, IA		L 10–21	47,500	
September 28	Michigan State*		Los Angeles Memorial Coliseum; Los Angeles, CA		W 56–14	44,026	
October 5	at Utah*		Robert Rice Stadium; Salt Lake City, UT		W 27–14	25,682	
October 12	Stanford		Los Angeles Memorial Coliseum; Los Angeles, CA		T 13–13	45,937	
October 19	Washington State		Los Angeles Memorial Coliseum; Los Angeles, CA		W 17–13	30,686	
October 26	at No. 20 California		California Memorial Stadium; Berkeley, CA (rivalry)		W 28–3	48,777	
November 2	at Washington	No. 8	Husky Stadium; Seattle, WA		L 9–31	52,000	
November 9	Oregon		Los Angeles Memorial Coliseum; Los Angeles, CA		W 21–0	32,713	
November 16	at Oregon State		Parker Stadium; Corvallis, OR		W 33–14	21,118	
November 23	No. 8 USC		Los Angeles Memorial Coliseum; Los Angeles, CA (Victory Bell})	ABC	L 9–34	82,467	
*Non-conference game; Rankings from AP Poll released prior to the game

== Roster ==
1974 UCLA Bruins football team roster
Players
Coaches
Offense

Pos.	#	Name	Class
WR	89	Norm Andersen	Jr
RB	30	Eddie Ayers	Jr
TE	81	Gene Bleymaier	Sr
RB	24	Russel Charles	Sr
OT	64	Gene Clark	Sr
G	51	Randy Cross	Jr
QB	19	Jeff Dankworth	So
WR	8	Wally Henry	So
G	65	Myke Horton	Sr
C	61	Art Kuehn	Sr
OT	73	Phil McKinnely	Jr
WR	3	Steve Monohan	Sr
QB	15	John Sciarra	Jr

Defense

Pos.	#	Name	Class
DT	76	Cliff Frazier	Jr
LB	8	Jack Jorgensen	Sr
CB	21	Phil Kimble	Sr
DT	77	Rick Kukulica	Sr
LB	93	Fulton Kuykendall	Sr
DT	53	Mike Martinez	Jr
CB	28	John Nanoski	Sr
S	23	Kent Pearce	Sr
LB	1	Herschel Ramsey	Sr
LB	59	Gene Settles	Sr
DT	67	Pat Sweetland	Sr
LB	56	Terry Tautolo	Jr
S	25	Greg Williams	Sr

Special teams

Pos.	#	Name	Class

Head coach

- Dick Vermeil

Coordinators/assistant coaches

- Jim Criner (OL)
- Terry Donahue
- Rod Dowhower (OC)
- Jerry Long
- Billie Matthews
- Jim Mora (LB)
- Carl Peterson
- Lynn Stiles (DC)
- Dick Tomey (DB)

Legend

- (C) Team captain
- (S) Suspended
- (I) Ineligible
- Injured
- Redshirt

== Honors ==
- All conference first team: Norm Anderson (SE), Gene Clark (OT), Fulton Kuykendall (LB)
