= Marvin Powell =

American football player (1955–2022)

No. 79, 74
- Position: Offensive tackle

Personal information
- Born: August 30, 1955; Fort Bragg, North Carolina, U.S.
- Died: September 30, 2022 (aged 67); Tampa, Florida, U.S.
- Listed height: 6 ft 5 in (1.96 m)
- Listed weight: 268 lb (122 kg)

Career information
- High school: Seventy-First (Fayetteville, North Carolina)
- College: USC
- NFL draft: 1977: 1st round, 4th overall pick

Career history
- New York Jets (1977–1985); Tampa Bay Buccaneers (1986–1987)

Awards and highlights
- 3× First-team All-Pro (1979, 1981, 1982); Second-team All-Pro (1980); 5× Pro Bowl (1979–1983); National champion (1974); 2× First-team All-American (1975, 1976); 3× First-team All-Pac-8 (1974, 1975, 1976)

Career NFL statistics
- Games played: 133
- Games started: 130
- Stats at Pro Football Reference
- College Football Hall of Fame

Marvin Powell Jr. (August 30, 1955 – September 30, 2022) was an American professional football player who was an offensive tackle in the National Football League (NFL) for the New York Jets and Tampa Bay Buccaneers. He played college football for the USC Trojans. Powell was elected into the College Football Hall of Fame in 1994.

== Early life and amateur career ==
Powell was born at Fort Bragg, North Carolina. His father, Marvin Sr. was a first sergeant and combat medic in the United States Army, and fought in the Normandy invasion in World War II, the Korean War, and deployed twice in Vietnam. Powell attended Seventy-First High School in Fayetteville, North Carolina.

Powell attended the University of Southern California (USC) and played college football for the Trojans. He was an all-conference selection in the Pacific-8 in 1974, 1975, and 1976. He was All-American in 1975 and 1976. He graduated from USC in 1977 with a Bachelor of Arts degree in political science and speech.

Powell was elected to the College Football Hall of Fame in 1994.

== Professional career ==
The New York Jets selected Powell in the first round, with the fourth overall selection, of the 1977 NFL draft. His teammates voted Powell the Jets' most valuable player for the 1979 season. He was selected to five consecutive Pro Bowls from 1979 to 1983. He was also named a first-team All-Pro in the 1979, 1981, and 1982 seasons. He was named second-team All-Pro in 1980. Powell started 128 games for the Jets.

The Jets offensive line allowed 62 quarterback sacks in 1985. The Jets selected offensive linemen with their first two selections of the 1986 NFL draft and the Jets cut Powell before the 1986 season. He signed with the Tampa Bay Buccaneers for the 1986 season. He played in nine games for Tampa Bay in the 1986 and 1987 seasons before he retired.

Powell was elected president of the National Football League Players Association during his playing career.

== Law career ==
Powell voiced his aspirations for politics, saying that he wished to run for president of the United States. A conservative, Powell worked on George H. W. Bush's 1980 presidential campaign.

Powell worked as an intern at the New York Stock Exchange and spent six off-seasons working on his Juris Doctor, which he earned from New York Law School in June 1987. In 1991, he joined Rosenfeld, Meyer, & Susman, a law firm in Beverly Hills, California.

== Personal life ==
Powell's son, Marvin III, played college football at USC between 1995 and 1998. A fullback, he played in the NFL for the New Orleans Saints, the Green Bay Packers, and the Denver Broncos.

Powell died of heart failure on September 30, 2022, at age 67 in Tampa, Florida.
