= 1975 All-Pacific-8 Conference football team =

The 1975 All-Pacific-8 Conference football team consists of American football players chosen by the United Press International (UPI) and the conference coaches as the best players by position in the Pac-8 Conference during the 1975 NCAA Division I football season. The UPI selections included players from non-Pac-8 teams.

The 1975 UCLA Bruins football team won the Pac-8 championship and was ranked No. 5 in the final AP Poll. Four UCLA players were selected to the first team: quarterback John Sciarra; guards Randy Cross and Phil McKinnely; and defensive tackle Cliff Frazier.

== Offensive selections ==
=== Quarterbacks ===
- John Sciarra, UCLA (Coaches-1)
- Craig Penrose, San Diego State (UPI-1)
- Joe Roth, California (Coaches-2)

=== Running backs ===
- Ricky Bell, USC (UPI-1; Coaches-1)
- Chuck Muncie, California (UPI-1; Coaches-1)
- Wendell Tyler, UCLA (Coaches-2)
- Robin Earl, Washington (Coaches-2)

=== Wide receivers ===
- Steve Rivera, California (UPI-1; Coaches-1)
- Tony Hill, Stanford (UPI-1; Coaches-1)
- Greg Bauer, Oregon (Coaches-2)
- Wesley Walker, California (Coaches-2)

=== Tight ends ===
- Ted Pappas, Stanford (UPI-1; Coaches-1)
- Carl Earshing, Washington State (Coaches-2)

=== Tackles ===
- Ted Albrecht, California (UPI-1; Coaches-1)
- Marvin Powell, USC (UPI-1; Coaches-1)
- Ron Hunt, Oregon (Coaches-2)
- Jack DeMartinis, UCLA (Coaches-2)

=== Guards ===
- Randy Cross, UCLA (UPI-1; Coaches-1)
- Phil McKinnely, UCLA (UPI-1; Coaches-1)
- Alex Karakozoff, Stanford (Coaches-1)
- Joe Davis, USC (Coaches-2)
- Mark Young, Washington State (Coaches-2)
- Mike Kobielsky, Oregon State (Coaches-2)

=== Centers ===
- Ray Pinney, Washington (UPI-1; Coaches-1)
- Todd Anderson, Stanford (Coaches-2)

== Defensive selections ==
=== Defensive ends ===
- Gary Jeter, USC (UPI-1; Coaches-1)
- Duncan McColl, Stanford (UPI-1; Coaches-1)

=== Defensive tackles ===
- Cliff Frazier, UCLA (UPI-1; Coaches-1)
- Mark Husfloen, Washington State (UPI-1)
- Charles Jackson, Washington (Coaches-2)
- Walt Underwood, USC (Coaches-2)
- Mark Husfloen, Washington State (Coaches-2)

=== Linebackers ===
- Bob Horn, Oregon State (UPI-1; Coaches-1)
- Dan Lloyd, Washington (UPI-1; Coaches-1)
- Phil Heck, California (UPI-1; Coaches-2)
- Kevin Bruce, USC (Coaches-1)
- Geb Church, Stanford (Coaches-1)
- Paul Strohmeier, Washington (Coaches-2)
- Scott Mullenix, Washington State (Coaches-2)
- Terry Tautolo, UCLA (Coaches-2)

=== Defensive backs ===
- Al Burleson, Washington (UPI-1; Coaches-1)
- Mario Clark, Oregon (UPI-1; Coaches-1)
- Danny Reece, USC (UPI-1; Coaches-1)
- Chuck Wills, Oregon (UPI-1; Coaches-1)
- Gerald Wilson, Stanford (Coaches-2)
- Oscar Edwards, UCLA (Coaches-2)
- Rich Waters, Stanford (Coaches-2)
- Frank Reed, Washington (Coaches-2)
- Clint Strozier, USC (Coaches-2)
- Doug Hogan, USC (Coaches-2)

== Special teams ==
=== Placekicker ===
- Mike Langford, Stanford (UPI-1; Coaches-1)
- Jim Breech, California (Coaches-2)

=== Punter ===
- Gavin Hedrick, Washington State (UPI-1; Coaches-1)
- Wendell Smith, Oregon State (Coaches-2)

== Key ==
UPI = United Press International

Coaches = Pacific-8 football coaches

== See also ==
- 1975 College Football All-America Team
