= Bill Bain (American football) =

American football player (born 1952)

No. 69, 75, 62
- Positions: Offensive guard, offensive tackle

Personal information
- Born: August 9, 1952 (age 74); Los Angeles, California, U.S.
- Listed height: 6 ft 4 in (1.93 m)
- Listed weight: 279 lb (127 kg)

Career information
- High school: Santa Fe Springs (CA) St. Paul
- College: USC
- NFL draft: 1975: 2nd round, 47th overall pick

Career history
- Green Bay Packers (1975); Denver Broncos (1976–1978); New York Giants (1978); Los Angeles Rams (1979–1985); New England Patriots (1986); New York Jets (1986)

Awards and highlights
- Second-team All-Pro (1984); 2× National champion (1972, 1974); First-team All-Pac-8 (1974)

Career NFL statistics
- Games played: 132
- Games started: 55
- Stats at Pro Football Reference

William Ernest Bain (born August 9, 1952) is an American former professional football player who was an offensive lineman in the National Football League (NFL). He played college football for the USC Trojans.

== Early life ==
Bain attended St. Paul High School, where he played for coach Marijon Ancich.

== College career ==
Bain played college football at the University of Southern California and was an All-America offensive lineman in 1974. Bain also played at University of Colorado and San Diego City College.

== Professional career ==
Bain was selected in the second round of the 1975 NFL Draft with the 47th overall pick by the Green Bay Packers. Bain played 11 seasons in the NFL. He played for the Green Bay Packers (1975), the Denver Broncos (1976, 1978), the Los Angeles Rams (1979–1985), the New England Patriots (1986), and the New York Jets (1986).

== Personal life ==
Bain and his wife, Elizabeth (Liz), have four daughters: Jennifer, Kristen, Anne (Annie), Elizabeth (Bitty). He has two grandchildren: William and Christopher. He currently resides in East Greenwich, RI.
