= J. K. McKay =

American football player (born 1953)

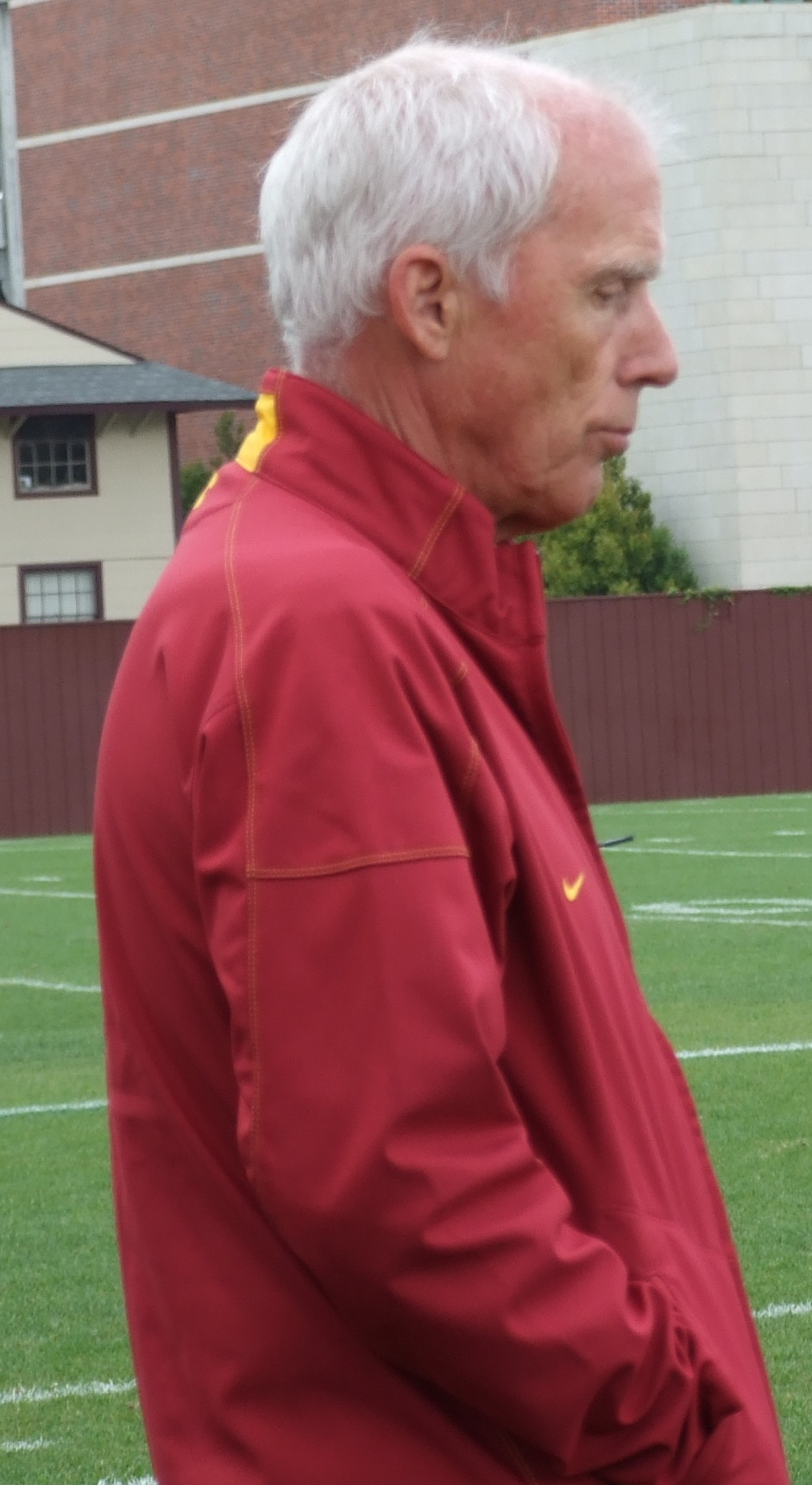
- McKay in 2011

No. 89
- Position: Wide receiver

Personal information
- Born: March 28, 1953 (age 73); Eugene, Oregon, U.S.
- Listed height: 5 ft 11 in (1.80 m)
- Listed weight: 182 lb (83 kg)

Career information
- High school: Bishop Amat (La Puente, California)
- College: USC
- NFL draft: 1975: 16th round, 394th overall pick

Career history
- Cleveland Browns (1975)*; Southern California Sun (1975); Tampa Bay Buccaneers (1976–1978)
- * Offseason or practice squad member only

Awards and highlights
- 2× National champion (1972, 1974); 2× Second-team All-Pac-8 (1973, 1974); 1975 Rose Bowl MVP

Career NFL statistics
- Receptions: 41
- Receiving yards: 632
- Receiving TDs: 2
- Stats at Pro Football Reference

John Kenneth McKay (born March 28, 1953) is an American former professional football player, trial attorney, and executive with positions at the Alliance of American Football (AAF) and the University of Southern California. As a professional athlete, McKay played wide receiver for the Tampa Bay Buccaneers of the National Football League (NFL) from 1976 to 1978.

== College career ==
McKay played college football for the USC Trojans, where he played on the 1972 and 1974 National Championship teams and caught, among many others, a 38-yard touchdown pass from long time best friend, quarterback Pat Haden in the fourth quarter of the 1975 Rose Bowl game. He was named co-MVP of the game along with Haden.

McKay was inducted into the Rose Bowl Hall of Fame in 1998.

== Professional career ==
He was selected by the Cleveland Browns in the 16th round of the 1975 NFL draft, but opted instead to play for the Southern California Sun of the World Football League due to a dislike for the Cleveland area. After the WFL ceased operations midway through its 1975 season, the Browns made him available in the 1976 NFL expansion draft, where he was selected by the expansion Tampa Bay Buccaneers. In Tampa Bay, McKay started at receiver for three controversial seasons. Quarterback Steve Spurrier's belief that McKay was playing ahead of better receivers because he was the son of head coach John McKay, led him to throw passes over the vulnerable middle of the field in an attempt to get McKay injured. McKay was considered a reliable pass-catcher whom opposing defenses considered as a legitimate threat. He was forced to retire due to complications from a broken hand. Later appraisal has supported Spurrier's skepticism regarding McKay's playing time; a 2011 Deadspin article bestowed McKay the dubious honor of being named the fifth-worst NFL player ever, calling him "the biggest beneficiary of nepotism in NFL history" who "lacked NFL speed and separation" while highlighting his only 41 catches across three seasons.

== Post-playing career ==
After retiring from professional football, McKay attended the Stetson University College of Law, and became a trial attorney in the Tampa area. In 1986, he moved to Los Angeles and continued practicing law as a partner with the law firm of Allen, Matkins, Leck, Gamble & Mallory. In 2001, he took a position as General Manager of the Los Angeles Xtreme in the XFL. The Xtreme were the first and only champions of the XFL.

In 2010, McKay became Senior Associate Athletic Director of the University of Southern California, under the direction of his friend and former teammate Pat Haden.

In 2018, he was announced as the Head of Football Operations of the Alliance of American Football.

== Personal life ==
McKay is a son of former USC Trojan and Tampa Bay Buccaneers coach John McKay and the older brother of former Buccaneers general manager and Atlanta Falcons president, Rich McKay.

McKay is married and has three children.

He is often referred to as "J. K." in the press, but is more commonly known as "John" or "Johnny".
