= 1973 All-Pacific-8 Conference football team =

The 1973 All-Pacific-8 Conference football team consists of American football players chosen by various organizations for All-Pacific-8 Conference teams for the 1973 NCAA Division I football season.

== Offensive selections ==
=== Quarterbacks ===
- Mike Boryla, Stanford (AP-2; UPI-1; Coaches-1)
- Jesse Freitas Jr., San Diego State (AP-1; UPI-2)

=== Running backs ===
- Anthony Davis, USC (AP-1; UPI-1; Coaches-1)
- Kermit Johnson, UCLA (AP-1; UPI-1; Coaches-1)
- Don Reynolds, Oregon (AP-2; UPI-1)
- Willard Harrell, Pacific (AP-2; UPI-2)
- Andrew Jones, Washington State (UPI-2)
- Chuck Muncie, California (UPI-2)

=== Wide receivers ===
- Lynn Swann, USC (AP-1; UPI-1; Coaches-1)
- Ike McBee, San Jose State (AP-1)
- Bill Singler, Stanford (Coaches-1)
- J. K. McKay, USC (AP-2)
- Keith Denson, San Diego State (AP-2)
- Bob Palm, Oregon (UPI-2)

=== Tight ends ===
- Russ Francis, Oregon (AP-2; UPI-1; Coaches-1)
- Jim Obradovich, USC (UPI-2; Coaches-1)
- Darold Nogle, San Diego State (AP-1)

=== Tackles ===
- Booker Brown, USC (AP-1; UPI-1; Coaches-1)
- Ed Kezirian, UCLA (AP-1; Coaches-1)
- Al Oliver, UCLA (UPI-1)
- Claudie Minor, San Diego State (AP-2; UPI-2)
- Keith Rowen, Stanford (AP-2)
- Ron Hunt, Oregon (UPI-2)

=== Guards ===
- Steve Ostermann, Washington State (AP-1; UPI-1; Coaches-1)
- Steve Klosterman, UCLA (AP-2; UPI-1; Coaches-1)
- Willie Viney, Pacific (AP-1; UPI-2)
- Chris Mackie, California (AP-2)
- Ted Seifert, California (UPI-2)

=== Centers ===
- Greg Krpalek, Oregon State (AP-1; UPI-1)
- Geoff Reece, Washington State (AP-2; Coaches-1)
- Bob McCaffrey, USC (UPI-2)

== Defensive selections ==
=== Defensive ends ===
- Fred McNeill, UCLA (AP-2; UPI-1; Coaches-1)
- Pat Donovan, USC (AP-1; UPI-1)
- Roger Stillwell, Stanford (AP-2; UPI-2; Coaches-1)
- Cal Peterson, UCLA (AP-1)

=== Defensive tackles ===
- Reggie Lewis, Oregon (AP-1; UPI-1; Coaches-1)
- Dave Pear, Washington (AP-1; UPI-1)
- Dave Wasick, San Jose State (AP-2)
- Dwayne Westphal, Fresno State (AP-2)
- Bob Swenson, California (UPI-2)

=== Middle guard ===
- Monte Doris, USC (AP-2; UPI-2; Coaches-1)
- Larry Bailey, Pacific (AP-1)

=== Linebackers ===
- Richard Wood, USC (AP-1; UPI-1; Coaches-1)
- Jimmy Sims, USC (AP-1; UPI-2; Coaches-1)
- Tom Poe, Washington State (AP-2; UPI-2; Coaches-1)
- Fulton Kuykendall, UCLA (UPI-2; Coaches-1)
- Gary Larsen, Washington State (UPI-1)
- Gordy Riegel, Stanford (UPI-1)
- Dan Lloyd, Washington (AP-2)
- Ivan Weiss, California (UPI-2)

=== Defensive backs ===
- Artimus Parker, USC (AP-1; UPI-1; Coaches-1)
- Randy Poltl, Stanford (AP-1; UPI-1; Coaches-1)
- Steve Donnelly, Oregon (AP-1; UPI-1; Coaches-1)
- Jim Bright, UCLA (AP-2; UPI-2; Coaches-1)
- Jimmy Allen, UCLA (AP-1)
- John Nanoski, UCLA (UPI-1)
- Jimmy Johnson, UCLA (Coaches-1)
- Danny Reece, USC (AP-2; UPI-2)
- Greg Bailey, Long Beach State (AP-2)
- Eric Johnson, Washington State (AP-2)
- Dennis Downey, Oregon State (UPI-2)
- Jim Kaffen, Stanford (UPI-2)

== Special teams ==
=== Placekicker ===
- Rod Garcia, Stanford (Coaches-1)

=== Punter ===
- Skip Boyd, Washington (Coaches-1)

== Key ==
AP = Associated Press

UPI = United Press International

Coaches = selected by the Pac-8 head football coaches

== See also ==
- 1973 College Football All-America Team
