= 1974 Washington State Cougars football team =

American college football season

1974 Washington State Cougars football
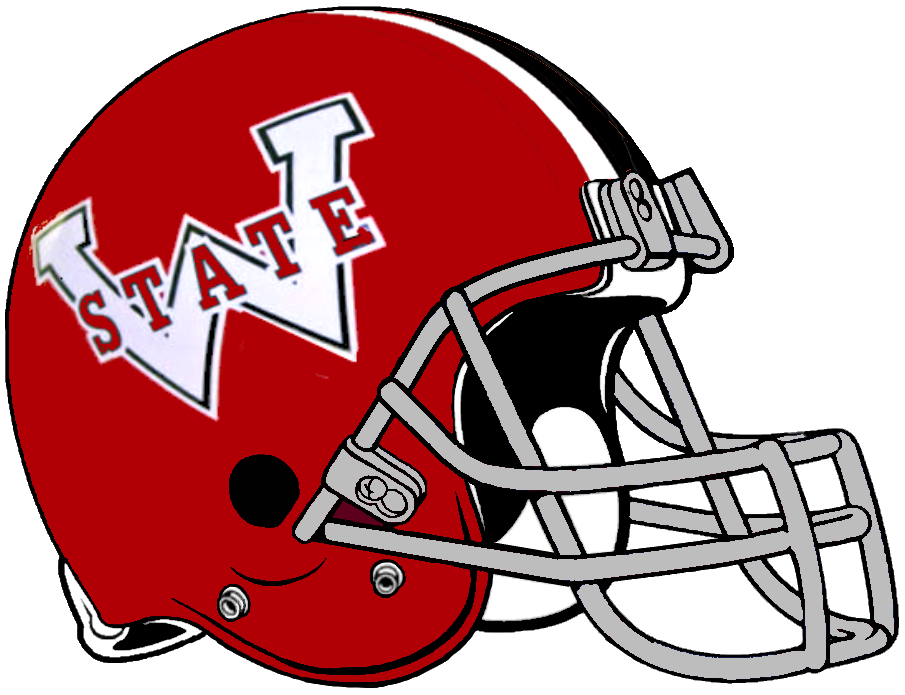
- Conference: Pacific-8 Conference
- Record: 2–9 (1–6 Pac-8)
- Head coach: Jim Sweeney (7th season)
- Offensive coordinator: Jack Elway (1st season)
- Defensive coordinator: Larry Donovan (1st season)
- Home stadium: Martin Stadium; Joe Albi Stadium; Husky Stadium

1974 Pacific-8 Conference football standings
	Conf.					Overall
Team	W		L		T	W		L		T
No. 2 USC $	6	–	0	–	1	10	–	1	–	1
Stanford	5	–	1	–	1	5	–	4	–	2
California	4	–	2	–	1	7	–	3	–	1
UCLA	4	–	2	–	1	6	–	3	–	2
Washington	3	–	4	–	0	5	–	6	–	0
Oregon State	3	–	4	–	0	3	–	8	–	0
Washington State	1	–	6	–	0	2	–	9	–	0
Oregon	0	–	7	–	0	2	–	9	–	0
$ – Conference champion; Rankings from AP Poll

The 1974 Washington State Cougars football team was an American football team that represented Washington State University in the Pacific-8 Conference (Pac-8) during the 1974 NCAA Division I football season. In their seventh season under head coach Jim Sweeney, the Cougars compiled a 2–9 record (1–6 in Pac-8, seventh), and were outscored 272 to 162.

The team's statistical leaders included John Hopkins with 522 passing yards, Ron Cheatham with 616 rushing yards, and Carl Barschig with 423 receiving yards.

Martin Stadium hosted three games; top-ranked Ohio State was played in Seattle (at Husky Stadium), and three games were at Joe Albi Stadium in Spokane, including the Apple Cup.

In Eugene, the Cougars defeated Oregon for the fourth straight year; it was WSU's only conference victory, and the Ducks went winless in the Pac-8. The Cougars had an opportunity for an unprecedented third consecutive victory over rival Washington, but lost by seven points in Spokane.

This was the final season for the student section's wooden north grandstand, constructed in the 1930s as part of Rogers Field; a new concrete grandstand replaced it in 1975.

== Schedule ==
Date	Opponent	Site	Result	Attendance	Source
September 14	Kansas*	Joe Albi Stadium; Spokane, WA	L 7–14	29,350	
September 21	Idaho*	Martin Stadium; Pullman, WA (Battle of the Palouse)	W 17–10	19,300	
September 28	at No. 18 Illinois*	Memorial Stadium; Champaign, IL	L 19–21	40,594	
October 5	vs. No. 1 Ohio State*	Husky Stadium; Seattle, WA	L 7–42	50,000	
October 12	No. 7 USC	Joe Albi Stadium; Spokane, WA	L 7–54	32,000	
October 19	at UCLA	Los Angeles Memorial Coliseum; Los Angeles, CA	L 13–17	30,686	
October 26	Stanford	Martin Stadium; Pullman, WA	L 18–20	22,000	
November 2	at Oregon	Autzen Stadium; Eugene, OR	W 21–16	21,500	
November 9	Oregon State^{†}	Martin Stadium; Pullman, WA	L 3–17	17,500	
November 16	at No. 19 California	California Memorial Stadium; Berkeley, CA	L 33–37	26,573	
November 23	Washington	Joe Albi Stadium; Spokane, WA (Apple Cup)	L 17–24	27,800	
*Non-conference game; ^{†}Homecoming; Rankings from AP Poll released prior to the game

== Roster ==
1974 Washington State Cougars football team roster
Players
Coaches
Offense

Pos.	#	Name	Class
G	69	Bob Aldrich	Sr
TE	80	Carl Barschig	Jr
QB	12	Wally Bennett	So
FB	30	Vern Chamberlain	Jr
HB	42	Ron Cheatham	Sr
G	60	Jon DesPois	So
RB	11	Dan Doornink	Fr
WR	44	Duke Fergerson	Jr
QB	18	John Hopkins	So
FB	39	Andrew Jones	Sr
WR	27	Ray Kimble	Jr
WR	3	Mike Maenhout	Jr
G	68	Wilbur McKinney	Sr
C	55	Steve Morton	Sr
G	62	Steve Ostermann	Sr
OT	78	Earl Owens	Sr
WR	1	Dennis Pearson	Fr
QB	13	Chuck Peck	Sr
C	65	Geoff Reece	Sr
OT	75	Robin Ross	Jr
OT	73	Dan Smith	Jr
QB	14	Jack Thompson	Fr
HB	24	Vaughn Williams	Jr
G	70	Mark Young	Jr

Defense

Pos.	#	Name	Class
SS	36	Mike Carter	Sr
SS	41	Tony Cook	Jr
CB	40	Robert Crow	Jr
FS	5	Rufus Cunningham	Jr
DE	79	Joe Daniels	Sr
DT	82	Dennis Dobberpuhl	Jr
CB	37	Ken Greene	Fr
CB	25	Tony Heath	Jr
LB	57	Don Hover	So
DE	90	Mark Husfloen	Jr
CB	22	Basil Kimbrew	Sr
LB	66	Gary Larsen	Sr
FS	10	Mike Mitchell	Sr
LB	58	Scott Mullenix	Jr
DT	87	Tim Ochs	So
DE	94	Bill Patterson	Jr
MG	67	Dean Pedigo	Fr
LB	52	Steve Robert	Sr
CB	20	Andre Stuckey	Jr

Special teams

Pos.	#	Name	Class
K	3	Joe Danelo	Sr
P	46	Gavin Hedrick	Fr

Head coach

- Jim Sweeney (7th year)

Coordinators/assistant coaches

- Jack Elway – (OC)
- Larry Donovan – (DC)
- Mike Price – (RB)
- Ron Mims – (DB)
- Walt Cubley – (DL)
- Bill Cords – (TE, JV)
- Tom Keele – (OL)
- Dick Roach – (LB)

Legend

- (C) Team captain
- (S) Suspended
- (I) Ineligible
- Injured
- Redshirt

== All-conference ==
Three Washington State seniors were named to the All-Pac-8 team; guard Steve Ostermann, center Geoff Reece, and linebacker Gary Larsen. Ostermann was named to the first team for a third consecutive year and Reece was a repeat selection.

== NFL draft ==
Three Cougars were selected in the 1975 NFL draft.

Player	Position	Round	Overall	Franchise
Andrew Jones	RB	3	60	New Orleans
Geoff Reece	C	3	61	Los Angeles Rams
Joe Danelo	PK	10	257	Miami Dolphins
