= Chris Limahelu =

American football placekicker (1950–2010)

Personal information
- Nationality: American
- Born: October 16, 1950 Ternate, Maluku Islands, Indonesia
- Died: April 7, 2010 (aged 59) Los Angeles, California, United States
- Height: 5 ft 5 in (1.65 m) (1972–1975)
- Weight: 135 lb (61 kg) (1972–1975)

Sport
- Sport: American football
- Event: Place kicker
- College team: USC Trojans; Citrus College Fighting Owls
- Coached by: John McKay
- Retired: 1975

Chris Limahelu (October 16, 1950 – April 7, 2010) was an Indonesian-American professional football placekicker for the USC Trojans football team during the 1973 and 1974 seasons when John McKay was the head coach.

Only 5 feet 5 inches (1.65 m) and 135 pounds (61 kg) during his playing career, he is remembered for setting new team records. His 47-yard field goal at the 1974 Rose Bowl game was the longest ever by a Trojan, breaking a 64-year-old Trojan record, and it became the second longest field goal in Rose Bowl history.

By the end of his career in 1975, Limahelu had kicked three of the five longest field goals in USC football history, a record which stood until Steve Jordan's 52-yard kicks, one in 1982 and another in 1983, and Don Shafer's 60-yard kick in 1985.

== Early years ==
Limahelu was born in Ternate, Indonesia. His family moved to the Netherlands when he was an infant, and by the time he was ten years old, he had learned to play soccer and had begun developing his kicking technique. His family then moved to the United States, where he attended South Hills High School in West Covina, California, joining their football, tennis and wrestling teams. After high school he attended Citrus College in Glendora, California before transferring to the University of Southern California (USC) where he majored in sociology.

== Football career ==
=== Sophomore ===
After transferring from Citrus College, Limahelu joined the USC football program and served on USC's junior varsity team in 1972 as a sophomore. It was then that his soccer-style place kicking first caught the eye of the media.

=== Junior ===
As a junior in the 1973 season, Limahelu set two Trojan records: he was successful in 14 of his 18 field goal attempts, six more than any previous Trojan kicker in a season, and in the 1974 Rose Bowl against Ohio State, he kicked both a 42-yard and a 47-yard field goal. Both of these were his longest kicks to date, and the 47-yard field goal became, at that time, the longest field goal ever by a Trojan place kicker, breaking a 64-year-old record.

He was also successful in completing 31 of 34 point-after-touchdown conversions overall. During the 1974 season, in a game against the Stanford University Cardinals, where USC was trailing 23–10 after 3 periods, Limahelu kicked a 34-yard field goal during the game's last 3 seconds, allowing USC to achieve a 27–26 victory, and keeping alive the USC bid for a place in the 1975 Rose Bowl berth.

=== Senior ===
As a senior, with his successful completion of 10 out of 17 field goal attempts and his successful 39 out of 43 point-after-touchdown conversions, Limahelu earned All-Pac-8 first team honors when the Trojans won the national title. In a game against the UCLA Bruins in late November, 1974, Limahelu's 30-yard field goal capped USC's second drive of the game. Later in the same game, he kicked a 50-yard field goal, which then became his personal best by breaking his own distance record from the previous year.

In the 1975 Rose Bowl game against the Ohio State Buckeyes, Limahelu kicked a 30-yard field goal, allowing USC to be the first to score in that game, however Ohio was leading 7–3 at halftime. At the end of the first half, Limahelu had kicked a 39-yard field goal, but an offsides penalty against Ohio gave USC an opportunity they accepted for a first down at the Buckeye's 16-yard-line. Ohio failed to score, and a 24-yard field goal attempt by Limahelu went wide. However, in the second half, he succeeded with a conversion kick that assured USC's 18–17 win over.

Up to that time, Limahelu had kicked three of the five longest field goals in USC football history. That record stood until Steve Jordan's two 52-yarders, one against Stanford in 1982 and a repeat 52-yarder against Washington State University Cougars in 1983, and the Don Shafer 60-yard field goal against the University of Notre Dame Fighting Irish in 1985.

== Later years ==
Limahelu became an accountant after his playing years, and had been a member of the Pasadena Tournament of Roses since 1995. Sean Limahelu, Chris Limahelu's nephew and godson, was a walk-on punter on USC's 2005 football team.

== Death ==
Limahelu died April 7, 2010, in Los Angeles after a long battle with prostate cancer. He was 59 years old. He is survived by his mother, Juliana; his brothers, Al, Robert, Frank, Henry, Rocky and Patrick; and his sister, Juliette.
