= Phil McKinnely =

American football player and official (born 1954)

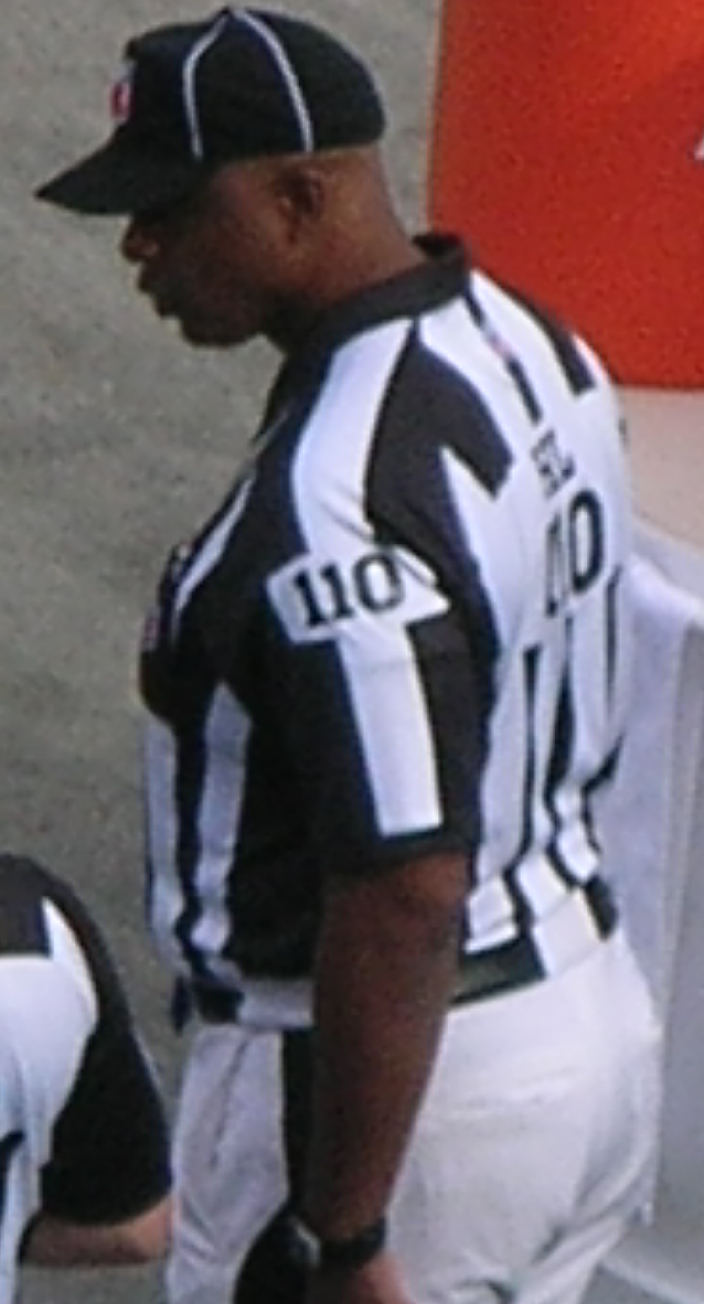
- McKinnely in 2008

No. 73, 67
- Position: Offensive tackle

Personal information
- Born: July 8, 1954 (age 72); Oakland, California, U.S.
- Listed height: 6 ft 4 in (1.93 m)
- Listed weight: 248 lb (112 kg)

Career information
- High school: St. Mary's (CA)
- College: UCLA
- NFL draft: 1976: 9th round, 246th overall pick

Career history
- Atlanta Falcons (1976–1980); Los Angeles Rams (1981); Chicago Bears (1982)

Awards and highlights
- First-team All-Pac-8 (1975); Second-team All-Pac-8 (1974)

Career NFL statistics
- Games played: 77
- Games started: 11
- Fumble recoveries: 3
- Stats at Pro Football Reference

Philip Byron McKinnely (born July 8, 1954) is an American former professional football player who was an offensive tackle for seven seasons in the National Football League (NFL), primarily for the Atlanta Falcons, and then in the United States Football League (USFL) for the Memphis Showboats and Birmingham Stallions. After retiring as a player, McKinnely became an American football official, working in college football's Southeastern Conference and NFL Europe before joining the NFL in 2002 as a head linesman. As an official, he wore uniform number 110, and retired following the 2019 NFL season.

He was accused by Samari Rolle of calling him "boy" on December 3, 2007, during a game between the Baltimore Ravens and the New England Patriots. The alleged exchange occurred late in the game when the Patriots retook the lead with 44 seconds remaining. Several penalties occurred in the closing minutes, including an unsportsmanlike conduct penalty when Raven Linebacker Bart Scott picked up a penalty flag and threw it into the stands in frustration of hearing the banter of Rolle and McKinnely. After the game, Rolle vented in the locker room to the reporters, "The refs called me a boy. No. 110 called me a boy, I will be calling my agent in the morning and sending my complaint. I have a wife and three kids. Don't call me a boy. Don't call me a boy on the field during a game because I said, 'You've never played football before." The NFL investigated the accusation.
