= 1974 Stanford Cardinals football team =

American college football season

1974 Stanford Cardinals football
- Conference: Pacific-8 Conference
- Record: 5–4–2 (5–1–1 Pac-8)
- Head coach: Jack Christiansen (3rd season)
- Defensive coordinator: Norb Hecker (3rd season)
- Home stadium: Stanford Stadium

1974 Pacific-8 Conference football standings
	Conf.					Overall
Team	W		L		T	W		L		T
No. 2 USC $	6	–	0	–	1	10	–	1	–	1
Stanford	5	–	1	–	1	5	–	4	–	2
California	4	–	2	–	1	7	–	3	–	1
UCLA	4	–	2	–	1	6	–	3	–	2
Washington	3	–	4	–	0	5	–	6	–	0
Oregon State	3	–	4	–	0	3	–	8	–	0
Washington State	1	–	6	–	0	2	–	9	–	0
Oregon	0	–	7	–	0	2	–	9	–	0
$ – Conference champion; Rankings from AP Poll

The 1974 Stanford Cardinals football team represented Stanford University in the Pacific-8 Conference during the 1974 NCAA Division I football season. Led by third-year head coach Jack Christiansen, the Cardinals were 5–4–2 overall (5–1–1 in Pac-8, second) and played home games on campus at Stanford Stadium in Stanford, California.

== Schedule ==
Date	Opponent	Rank	Site	TV	Result	Attendance	Source
September 14	at No. 8 Penn State*	No. 20	Beaver Stadium; University Park, PA	ABC	L 20–24	58,200	
September 21	Illinois*	No. 19	Stanford Stadium; Stanford, CA		L 7–41	47,500	
September 28	San Jose State*		Stanford Stadium; Stanford, CA (rivalry)		T 21–21	45,000	
October 5	No. 4 Michigan*		Stanford Stadium; Stanford, CA		L 16–27	52,500	
October 12	at UCLA		Los Angeles Memorial Coliseum; Los Angeles, CA		T 13–13	45,937	
October 19	Washington		Stanford Stadium; Stanford, CA		W 34–17	38,000	
October 26	at Washington State		Martin Stadium; Pullman, WA		W 20–18	22,000	
November 2	Oregon State		Stanford Stadium; Stanford, CA		W 17–13	38,500	
November 9	No. 11 USC		Stanford Stadium; Stanford, CA (rivalry)		L 10–34	83,500	
November 16	at Oregon		Autzen Stadium; Eugene, OR		W 17–0	18,500	
November 23	at No. 19 California		California Memorial Stadium; Berkeley, CA (Big Game)		W 22–20	71,866	
*Non-conference game; Rankings from AP Poll released prior to the game

== Roster ==
1973 Stanford Cardinal football team roster
Players
Coaches
Offense

Pos.	#	Name	Class
OL		Keith Rowen	Sr
FB		Scott Laidlaw	Sr

Defense

Pos.	#	Name	Class
DE		Pat Donovan	Sr
DE		Roger Stillwell	Sr
LB		John Snider

Special teams

Pos.	#	Name	Class

Head coach

- Jack Christiansen (3rd year)

Coordinators/assistant coaches

- David Currey – Offensive back
- Pete Kettela – Receivers
- Hudson Houck – Offensive line
- Norb Hecker – Defensive Coordinator & linebacker
- Gunther Cunningham – Defensive line
- George Seifert – Defensive back
- Willie Shaw – Special Teams Coordinator and outside linebacker

Legend

- (C) Team captain
- (S) Suspended
- (I) Ineligible
- Injured
- Redshirt
