= Charlie Phillips (American football) =

American football player (born 1952)

Charles Phillips
No. 47
- Position: Safety

Personal information
- Born: December 22, 1952 (age 73); Greenville, Mississippi, U.S.
- Listed height: 6 ft 2 in (1.88 m)
- Listed weight: 215 lb (98 kg)

Career information
- High school: Blair (Pasadena, California)
- College: USC
- NFL draft: 1975: 2nd round, 45th overall pick

Career history
- Oakland Raiders (1975–1979)

Awards and highlights
- 2× Super Bowl champion (XI, XV); 2× National champion (1972, 1974); First-team All-American (1974); First-team All-Pac-8 (1974)

Career NFL statistics
- Interceptions: 19
- Fumble recoveries: 7
- Defensive touchdowns: 3
- Stats at Pro Football Reference

Charles Phillips (born December 22, 1952) is an American former professional football player who was a safety for the Oakland Raiders of the National Football League (NFL). He played college football for the USC Trojans. Phillips was part of the Raiders team when they won Super Bowl XI in 1977.

== College career ==
Phillips played college football at the University of Southern California and had an NCAA record 302 yards from interceptions in 1974.

== Professional career ==
Phillips played in the NFL between 1975 and 1979. In 1978, which was arguably his best season, he led the NFL in non-offensive touchdowns with 3, fumble return touchdowns with 2 and he also led the NFL in fumble return yards with 127 yards. He recorded 19 interceptions in his career.
