= Gary Jeter =

American football player (1955–2016)

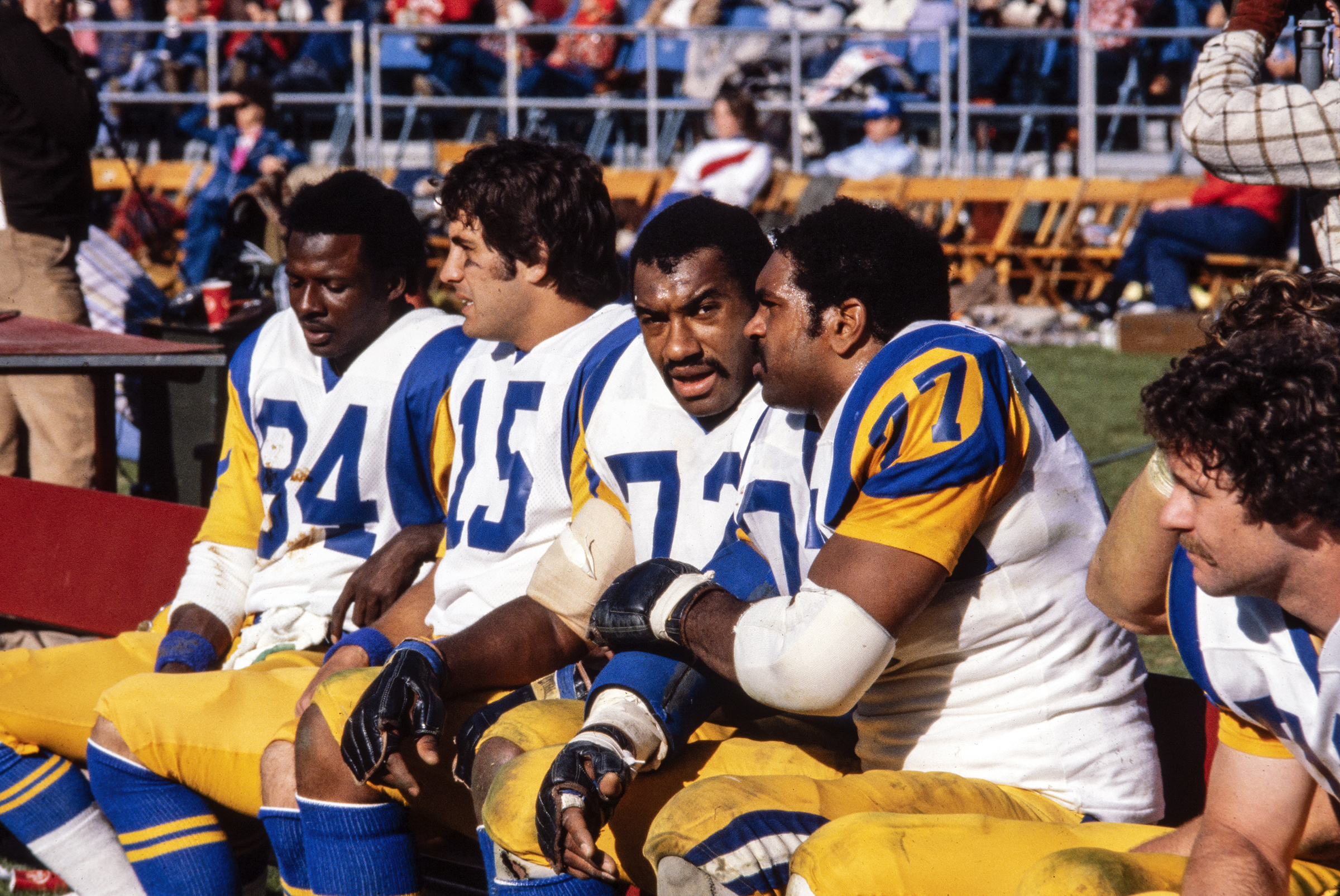
- George Farmer (84), Vince Ferragamo (15), Kent Hill (72), with Gary Jeter (77) at right

No. 70, 77, 99
- Positions: Defensive end, defensive tackle

Personal information
- Born: January 24, 1955; Weirton, West Virginia, U.S.
- Died: March 9, 2016 (aged 61); Plainsboro Township, New Jersey, U.S.
- Listed height: 6 ft 4 in (1.93 m)
- Listed weight: 259 lb (117 kg)

Career information
- High school: Cathedral Latin (OH)
- College: USC
- NFL draft: 1977: 1st round, 5th overall pick

Career history
- New York Giants (1977–1982); Los Angeles Rams (1983–1988); New England Patriots (1989)

Awards and highlights
- All-Rookie (1977); George Halas Award (1986); National champion (1974); Consensus All-American (1976); Second-team All-American (1975); 3× First-team All-Pac-8 (1974, 1975, 1976)

Career NFL statistics
- Sacks: 79
- Fumble recoveries: 6
- Safeties: 1
- Stats at Pro Football Reference

Gary Michael Jeter (January 24, 1955 – March 9, 2016) was an American professional football player who was a defensive end in the National Football League (NFL). An All-American playing college football for the USC Trojans in 1976, Jeter was selected by the New York Giants in the first round (fifth overall) of the 1977 NFL draft.

== College career ==
After his graduation from Cathedral Latin School, Cleveland, Ohio, Jeter started every game at Defensive end for USC from his 3rd game in 1974 until his final game in the Rose Bowl in 1977 and was a member of 1974 National Championship team. In 1976 First-team All-American and while at USC he started in three Rose Bowls (1974, 1975, and 1977). He was a three-time All-Conference First-team (1974, 1975, 1976) and won USC's Defensive Player of the Year Award in 1975.

== Professional career ==
Jeter played in 13 NFL seasons from 1977 to 1989 for the New York Giants, Los Angeles Rams and New England Patriots. During his professional career, he amassed 79 sacks. He was a starter with the Giants through the 1981 season and was a back-up in 1982. As a rookie in 1977 he was an All-Rookie selection and recorded 3 sacks, a number he matched in 1978. In 1979, he had 4 sacks. In 1980, he led the Giants with 10 sacks and was an alternate to the Pro Bowl. In 1981, he had 7 sacks as the resurgent Giants defense led by Lawrence Taylor, made the playoffs for the first time in Jeter's career. In 1982, slowed by a left-knee injury and by the player's strike, Jeter played only four games and did not record a sack.

On April 9, 1983, he was traded to the Los Angeles Rams. Jeter spent the 1983 season as a backup and as a designated pass rusher——who came in to rush the quarterback on likely passing downs. He recorded 6 1/2 sacks in that role. In 1984 Jeter had back trouble and missed most of the season.

In 1985, he came back healthy and resumed the "designated" role for the Rams totaling 11 sacks, which again was second on the team. He was voted Comeback Player of the Year after the 1985 season. In 1986 (8 sacks), 1987 (7 sacks) and 1988 Jeter performed exceptionally well in his role, getting a career-high 11 1/2 sacks in 1988, including 5 in one game against the Los Angeles Raiders on September 18, 1988, for which he was awarded the NFC Player of the Week.

After the 1988 season the Rams left Jeter an unprotected "Plan B" free agent and the New England Patriots signed him to do the same job he'd been doing in Los Angeles—to come off the bench on third down and rush the quarterback. He ended the 1989 season with 7 sacks. Jeter was released by the Patriots August 29, 1990. The Los Angeles Rams agreed to terms with him, however, he failed the team physical due to a chronic back problem.

== Personal life and death ==
Following his career in the NFL, Jeter resided in Plainsboro, New Jersey, working as a baker, a haberdasher, and a businessman.

Jeter died on March 9, 2016, at the age of 61 of an apparent heart attack. He was survived by his wife Leslie, and four daughters − Ayisha, Denyse, Kayla, and Breana. Kayla was a standout volleyball player, earning All-American honors at the University of Tennessee. Upon graduation Kayla earned her master's degree and played two years of professional volleyball in Helsinki, Finland. She was an assistant volleyball coach at the University of Cincinnati until 2018. His youngest daughter, Breana, graduated from the University of Tennessee.
