= Steve Knutson =

American football player (born 1951)

No. 60
- Position: Guard

Personal information
- Born: October 5, 1951 (age 75); Bagley, Minnesota, U.S.
- Listed height: 6 ft 3 in (1.91 m)
- Listed weight: 254 lb (115 kg)

Career information
- High school: South Gate (South Gate, California)
- College: USC
- NFL draft: 1975: 16th round, 393rd overall pick

Career history
- Green Bay Packers (1976–1977); San Francisco 49ers (1978)

Awards and highlights
- Second-team All-Pac-8 (1974)

Career NFL statistics
- Games played: 40
- Games started: 9
- Stats at Pro Football Reference

Steven Craig Knutson (born October 5, 1951) is an American former professional football player who was a guard for three seasons in the National Football League (NFL). He played college football for the USC Trojans. He started his NFL career with the Green Bay Packers before finishing with the San Francisco 49ers.

== Biography ==
Knutson was born Steven Craig Knutson in Bagley, Minnesota.

== Career ==
Knutson was selected in the 16th round (393rd overall) of the 1975 NFL draft by the Atlanta Falcons. He would later play two seasons with the Green Bay Packers. During his final season, he would play with the San Francisco 49ers.

He played at the collegiate level at the University of Southern California.
