= 1974 Oregon Ducks football team =

American college football season

1974 Oregon Ducks football
- Conference: Pacific-8 Conference
- Record: 2–9 (0–7 Pac-8)
- Head coach: Don Read (1st season)
- Offensive coordinator: Joe Wade (1st season)
- Offensive scheme: Veer
- Defensive coordinator: Fred von Appen (1st season)
- Captains: Norv Turner; Tim Slapnicka
- Home stadium: Autzen Stadium

Uniform

1974 Pacific-8 Conference football standings
	Conf.					Overall
Team	W		L		T	W		L		T
No. 2 USC $	6	–	0	–	1	10	–	1	–	1
Stanford	5	–	1	–	1	5	–	4	–	2
California	4	–	2	–	1	7	–	3	–	1
UCLA	4	–	2	–	1	6	–	3	–	2
Washington	3	–	4	–	0	5	–	6	–	0
Oregon State	3	–	4	–	0	3	–	8	–	0
Washington State	1	–	6	–	0	2	–	9	–	0
Oregon	0	–	7	–	0	2	–	9	–	0
$ – Conference champion; Rankings from AP Poll

The 1974 Oregon Ducks football team represented the University of Oregon in the Pacific-8 Conference (Pac-8) during the 1974 NCAA Division I football season. Led by first-year head coach Don Read, the Ducks compiled a 2–9 record (0–7 in Pac-8, last) and were outscored 330 to 116. Home games were played in Eugene at Autzen Stadium.

A former head coach at Portland State, Read had been an Oregon assistant for two years (quarterbacks, receivers); he was promoted in early January, immediately after Dick Enright was fired by athletic director Norv Ritchey.

Through 2026, this is the most recent season that Oregon football finished last in conference and is widely considered to be the worst season in program history.

== Schedule ==
Date	Time	Opponent	Site	Result	Attendance	Source
September 14	11:30 am	at No. 7 Nebraska*	Memorial Stadium; Lincoln, NE	L 7–61	76,053	
September 21	1:50 pm	Air Force*	Autzen Stadium; Eugene, OR	W 27–23	23,500	
September 28	6:30 pm	at Utah*	Robert Rice Stadium; Salt Lake City, UT	W 23–16	23,420	
October 5	11:30 am	at Northwestern*	Dyche Stadium; Evanston, IL	L 10–14	30,481	
October 12	1:30 pm	at California	California Memorial Stadium; Berkeley, CA	L 10–40	37,268	
October 19	1:30 pm	No. 6 USC	Autzen Stadium; Eugene, OR	L 7–16	32,500	
October 26	1:30 pm	at Washington	Husky Stadium; Seattle, WA (rivalry)	L 0–66	52,500	
November 2	1:30 pm	Washington State	Autzen Stadium; Eugene, OR	L 16–21	21,500	
November 9	1:30 pm	at UCLA	Los Angeles Memorial Coliseum; Los Angeles, CA	L 0–21	32,713	
November 16	1:30 pm	Stanford	Autzen Stadium; Eugene, OR	L 0-17	18,500	
November 23	1:30 pm	at Oregon State	Parker Stadium; Corvallis, OR (rivalry)	L 16–35	32,156	
*Non-conference game; Rankings from AP Poll released prior to the game; All times are in Pacific time

== Roster ==
1974 Oregon Ducks football team roster
Players
Coaches
Offense

Pos.	#	Name	Class
RB	22	Don Reynolds	Sr
QB	17	Norv Turner	Sr

Defense

Pos.	#	Name	Class
S	38	Steve Donnelly	Sr
DE	88	Don Johnson	Jr
DE	99	George Martin	Sr
FS	12	Chuck Wills	Jr

Special teams

Pos.	#	Name	Class

Head coach

- Don Read (1st year)

Coordinators/assistant coaches

- Joe Wade (OC)
- Fred von Appen (DC)

Legend

- (C) Team captain
- (S) Suspended
- (I) Ineligible
- Injured
- Redshirt

== All-conference ==
One Oregon senior was named to the All-Pac-8 team; safety Steve Donnelly was a repeat selection.

== NFL draft ==
Two Oregon seniors were selected in the 1975 NFL draft: tight end Russ Francis (16th) and defensive end George Martin (262nd); Francis sat out the 1974 season.
