= Steve Rivera =

American football player (born 1954)

No. 80, 83
- Position: Wide receiver

Personal information
- Born: August 5, 1954 (age 72); Pensacola, Florida, U.S.
- Listed height: 5 ft 11 in (1.80 m)
- Listed weight: 184 lb (83 kg)

Career information
- High school: Phineas Banning (Los Angeles, California)
- College: California
- NFL draft: 1976: 4th round, 8th overall pick

Career history
- San Francisco 49ers (1976); Chicago Bears (1977); San Francisco 49ers (1977)

Awards and highlights
- Consensus All-American (1975); Third-team All-American (1974); 2× First-team All-Pac-8 (1974, 1975)

Career NFL statistics
- Receptions: 2
- Receiving yards: 14
- Return yards: 10
- Stats at Pro Football Reference

Steve Rivera (born August 5, 1954) is an American former professional football player who was a wide receiver in the National Football League (NFL). He played college football for the California Golden Bears before playing in the NFL for the Chicago Bears and San Francisco 49ers.

== Early life ==
Rivera attended Banning High School in Wilmington, California. He was a two-year letterman in football where he was starting Receiver. Rivera led the team in receptions and receiving yardage his senior year. Rivera also was named to the All Marine League and Los Angeles City 1st Team as a receiver. Rivera was receiving his passes from Quarterback Vince Ferragamo who also went on to play in the NFL. The Ferragamo to Rivera air bomb was one of the most feared high school tandems in the United States their senior year.

== College career ==
Rivera inked a letter of intent with the University of California Golden Bears, where he was named 1975 Consensus All-America Team. Rivera was a receiver and punt-return specialist. Rivera had 138 career receptions and 2085 receiving yard for 9 total touchdowns.

== Professional career ==
Rivera was selected in the fourth round with the 100th pick of the 1976 NFL draft by the San Francisco 49ers. He also a briefly with the Chicago Bears for three games and then traded back to the San Francisco 49ers in 1977. He spent the 1978 season on injured reserve before being released in 1979. Steve works in construction. http://cheslerconstructioninc.com/about/
