= Dave Pear =

American football player (born 1953)

No. 65, 74, 76
- Positions: Defensive tackle, nose tackle

Personal information
- Born: June 1, 1953 (age 73); Vancouver, Washington, U.S.
- Listed height: 6 ft 2 in (1.88 m)
- Listed weight: 260 lb (118 kg)

Career information
- High school: Benson Polytechnic (Portland, Oregon)
- College: Washington
- NFL draft: 1975: 3rd round, 56th overall pick

Career history
- Baltimore Colts (1975); Tampa Bay Buccaneers (1976–1978); Oakland Raiders (1979–1980)

Awards and highlights
- Super Bowl champion (XV); 2× All-Pro (1977, 1978); Pro Bowl (1978); First-team All-Pac-8 (1973); Second-team All-Pac-8 (1974)

Career NFL statistics
- Games played: 79
- Games started: 62
- Fumbles recovered: 7
- Stats at Pro Football Reference

David Louis Pear (born June 1, 1953) is an American former professional football player who was a defensive lineman in the National Football League (NFL). He was the first Tampa Bay Buccaneers player to be selected to a Pro Bowl and played in Super Bowl XV for the winning Oakland Raiders.

Pear played college football for the Washington Huskies football in Seattle under longtime head coach Jim Owens. He was selected in the third round of the 1975 NFL draft by the Baltimore Colts with the 56th overall pick.

Through his football career, Pear suffered a number of injuries which required spinal surgery and hip replacement and have resulted in vertigo, memory loss, and speech impairment.

He has also been quoted saying, "Don't let your kids play football. Never."

== See also ==
- Washington Huskies football statistical leaders
