= 1974 Oregon State Beavers football team =

American college football season

1974 Oregon State Beavers football
- Conference: Pacific-8 Conference
- Record: 3–8 (3–4 Pac-8)
- Head coach: Dee Andros (10th season)
- Home stadium: Parker Stadium

1974 Pacific-8 Conference football standings
	Conf.					Overall
Team	W		L		T	W		L		T
No. 2 USC $	6	–	0	–	1	10	–	1	–	1
Stanford	5	–	1	–	1	5	–	4	–	2
California	4	–	2	–	1	7	–	3	–	1
UCLA	4	–	2	–	1	6	–	3	–	2
Washington	3	–	4	–	0	5	–	6	–	0
Oregon State	3	–	4	–	0	3	–	8	–	0
Washington State	1	–	6	–	0	2	–	9	–	0
Oregon	0	–	7	–	0	2	–	9	–	0
$ – Conference champion; Rankings from AP Poll

The 1974 Oregon State Beavers football team represented Oregon State University as a member of the Pacific-8 Conference (Pac-8) during the 1974 NCAA Division I football season. In their tenth season under head coach Dee Andros, the Beavers compiled an overall record of 3–8 record with a mark of 3–4 conference play, tying for fifth pace in the Pac-8, and were outscored 275 to 216. Oregon State played home games on campus at Parker Stadium in Corvallis, Oregon.

With the team's 35–16 win over rival Oregon in the season finale, Andros' record improved to 9–1 over the Ducks in the Civil War game.

== Schedule ==
Date	Opponent	Site	Result	Attendance	Source
September 7	at Syracuse*	Archbold Stadium; Syracuse, NY	L 15–23	23,410	
September 14	at Georgia*	Sanford Stadium; Athens, GA	L 35–48	42,200	
September 21	at No. 2 Ohio State*	Ohio Stadium; Columbus, OH	L 10–51	86,383	
October 5	at SMU*	Cotton Bowl; Dallas, TX	L 30–37	16,958	
October 12	Washington	Parker Stadium; Corvallis, OR	W 23–9	26,951	
October 19	California	Parker Stadium; Corvallis, OR	L 14–17	23,075	
October 26	at No. 6 USC	Los Angeles Memorial Coliseum; Los Angeles, CA	L 10–31	52,392	
November 2	at Stanford	Stanford Stadium; Stanford, CA	L 13–17	38,500	
November 9	at Washington State	Martin Stadium; Pullman, WA	W 17–3	17,500	
November 16	UCLA	Parker Stadium; Corvallis, OR	L 14–33	21,118	
November 23	Oregon	Parker Stadium; Corvallis, OR (Civil War)	W 35–16	32,156	
*Non-conference game; Rankings from AP Poll released prior to the game

== Roster ==
- QB Alvin White
