= Jim Obradovich =

American football player (born 1953)

No. 89, 86
- Position: Tight end

Personal information
- Born: January 7, 1953 (age 73); Los Angeles, California, U.S.
- Listed height: 6 ft 2 in (1.88 m)
- Listed weight: 225 lb (102 kg)

Career information
- High school: El Segundo (El Segundo, California)
- College: USC
- NFL draft: 1975: 7th round, 158th overall pick

Career history
- New York Giants (1975); San Francisco 49ers (1976–1978); Tampa Bay Buccaneers (1979–1983)

Awards and highlights
- 2× First-team All-Pac-8 (1973, 1974)

Career NFL statistics
- Receptions: 56
- Receiving yards: 661
- Receiving TDs: 7
- Stats at Pro Football Reference

James Robert Obradovich (born January 7, 1953) is an American former professional football player who was a tight end in the National Football League (NFL) for the New York Giants, San Francisco 49ers, and Tampa Bay Buccaneers. His 80 career tackles on kickoff coverage are the most in Buccaneer history.

== College career ==
Obradovich played college football for the Trojans of the University of Southern California and was selected in the seventh round of the 1975 NFL draft.
