= 1974 California Golden Bears football team =

American college football season

1974 California Golden Bears football
- Conference: Pacific-8 Conference
- Record: 7–3–1 (4–2–1 Pac-8)
- Head coach: Mike White (3rd season)
- Offensive coordinator: Roger Theder
- Home stadium: California Memorial Stadium

1974 Pacific-8 Conference football standings
	Conf.					Overall
Team	W		L		T	W		L		T
No. 2 USC $	6	–	0	–	1	10	–	1	–	1
Stanford	5	–	1	–	1	5	–	4	–	2
California	4	–	2	–	1	7	–	3	–	1
UCLA	4	–	2	–	1	6	–	3	–	2
Washington	3	–	4	–	0	5	–	6	–	0
Oregon State	3	–	4	–	0	3	–	8	–	0
Washington State	1	–	6	–	0	2	–	9	–	0
Oregon	0	–	7	–	0	2	–	9	–	0
$ – Conference champion; Rankings from AP Poll

The 1974 California Golden Bears football team was an American football team that represented the University of California, Berkeley in the Pacific-8 Conference (Pac-8) during the 1974 NCAA Division I football season. In their third year under head coach Mike White, the Golden Bears compiled a 7–3–1 record (4–2–1 in Pac-8, tied for third), and outscored their opponents by a combined total of 276 to 213. The Pac-8 did not allow a second bowl team until the following season (1975).

The team's statistical leaders included Steve Bartkowski with 2,580 passing yards, Chuck Muncie with 791 rushing yards, and Steve Rivera with 938 receiving yards.

== Schedule ==
Date	Opponent	Rank	Site	Result	Attendance	Source
September 14	at Florida*		Florida Field; Gainesville, FL	L 17–21	39,521	
September 21	San Jose State*		California Memorial Stadium; Berkeley, CA	W 17–16	25,000	
September 28	Army*		California Memorial Stadium; Berkeley, CA	W 27–14	22,470	
October 5	at No. 14 Illinois*		Memorial Stadium; Champaign, IL	W 31–14	54,378	
October 12	Oregon		California Memorial Stadium; Berkeley, CA	W 40–10	37,268	
October 19	at Oregon State		Parker Stadium; Corvallis, OR	W 17–14	23,075	
October 26	UCLA	No. 20	California Memorial Stadium; Berkeley, CA (rivalry)	L 3–28	48,777	
November 2	at No. 6 USC		Los Angeles Memorial Coliseum; Los Angeles, CA	T 15–15	53,921	
November 9	at Washington	No. 18	Husky Stadium; Seattle, WA	W 52–26	54,500	
November 16	Washington State	No. 19	California Memorial Stadium; Berkeley, CA	W 37–33	26,573	
November 23	Stanford	No. 19	California Memorial Stadium; Berkeley, CA (Big Game)	L 20–22	71,866	
*Non-conference game; Rankings from AP Poll released prior to the game

== NFL draft ==
Three Golden Bears were selected in the 1975 NFL draft; quarterback Steve Bartkowski was the first overall selection.

Player	Position	Round	Overall	Franchise
Steve Bartkowski	QB	1	1	Atlanta Falcons
Dallas Hickman	DE	9	228	Washington Redskins
Howard Strickland	RB	11	281	Los Angeles Rams
