= Sulphur Springs Mountain =

Mountain in California, United States

- Location within California

Highest point
- Elevation: 1,112 ft (339 m) NGVD 29
- Coordinates: 38°09′05″N 122°11′30″W

Geography
- Location: Solano County, California, U.S.
- Topo map: USGS Cordelia

Climbing
- Easiest route: Trail hike

Sulphur Springs Mountain (or Sulfur Springs Mountain) is a mountain in southwestern Solano County, California. The slopes can be accessed via hiking trails emanating from Blue Rock Springs Park in the city of Vallejo. Cinnabar deposits were extracted from this location in the early 1900s at Hastings Mine and St. John's Mine. Both mines are classified as medium priority mine from the standpoint of environmental oversight for California inactive mines. The highest peak on Sulfur Springs Mountain stands at an elevation of 1,112 feet (339 m), and affords expansive views of the northern San Francisco Bay as well as the Napa River. The rock outcroppings which occur in the Sulphur Springs area are composed of basaltic lava; however, there are also serpentine outcrops, which soils are known to provide habitat for many rare and endangered species in Northern California.There are the remains of three native American village sites on Sulphur Springs Mountain above Blue Rock springs park that had been inhabited by The Suisunes, The Coastal Miwok and other Patwin tribes.

== Hydrology ==
The Earth Metrics research found that in excess of 100,000 gallons per day was produced by the principal sulfur spring on this mountain as recently as 1927; by the 1940s this flow was all but attenuated, due to extensive mine shaft construction. Streams that drain the mountain slopes include Rindler Creek and Blue Rock Springs Creek. Blue Rock Springs Creek has been tested for the toxin diazinon and found to have attained an elevated value of 40.9 micrograms per liter (Diazinon is a toxic pesticide associated with golf course maintenance). Prior hydrology modeling has been performed using the HEC-2 formalism to analyze flows in both Rindler Creek and Blue Rock Springs Creek; these studies were conducted to evaluate flooding potential and in order to conduct certain channel alterations associated with urban development on the lower slopes of Sulfur Springs Mountain.

The Hastings Mine is classified as a medium priority mine from the standpoint of environmental oversight. In the last inspection of the Hastings Mine in 1997, sediments in a drainage below the mine were found to contain ten parts per million of mercury; furthermore, spring water below the mine exhibited a water concentration of .31 micrograms per liter (a violation of the State of California standard for receiving waters of .05 micrograms per liter). Miles of underground shafts were driven in the course of working the quicksilver deposits in the area.

== See also ==
- List of summits of the San Francisco Bay Area
- Mercury
- Tailings
- Water pollution
