= Blue Rock Springs Creek =

Location
- Country: United States
- State: California
- Region: Solano County
- City: Vallejo

Physical characteristics
- Source: Sulfur Springs Mountain
  - location: 10 miles (16 km) east of Vallejo
  - coordinates: 38°6′43″N 122°11′4″W
  - elevation: 400 ft (120 m)
- Mouth: Rindler Creek
  - location: Solano County Fairgrounds in Vallejo
  - coordinates: 38°7′51″N 122°13′40″W
  - elevation: 85 ft (26 m)

Blue Rock Springs Creek is a 3.4-mile-long (5.5 km) stream that rises on Sulfur Springs Mountain in southwestern Solano County, California. A bicycle trail is positioned along the creekside in some of the lower reaches. Water quality is impaired in Blue Rock Springs Creek due to historic cinnabar extraction in this watershed. Blue Rock Springs Creek has been tested for the toxin diazinon and found to have attained an elevated value of 40.9 micrograms per liter; diazinon is a toxic pesticide associated with golf course maintenance. The 36-hole Blue Rock Springs Golf Course lies in this watershed; although diazinon has been banned for golf course use in the U.S., its persistence in the environment is quite high. The stream has had application of a hydrological transport model to analyze flooding potential and to aid in the design of certain stream channel modification carried out in the last quarter of the 20th century to accommodate urbanization of some of the lower reaches.

Cinnabar deposits were extracted from this watershed in the early 1900s at Hastings Mine and St. John's Mine. Shaft construction occurred no earlier than 1918 and mining had ceased by the year 1930.

== See also ==
- Flood control
- List of watercourses in the San Francisco Bay Area
- Rindler Creek
- Serpentine soil
