= Rindler Creek =

Location
- Country: United States
- State: California
- Region: Solano County
- City: Vallejo, California

Physical characteristics
- Source: Sulphur Springs Mountain
  - location: 5 mi (8 km) northeast of Vallejo
  - coordinates: 38°9′0″N 122°11′34″W
  - elevation: 840 ft (260 m)
- Mouth: Lake Chabot, Solano County
  - location: Six Flags Discovery Kingdom
  - coordinates: 38°8′5″N 122°13′48″W
  - elevation: 82 ft (25 m)
- Length: 4 mi (6.4 km)

Basin features
- Tributaries
  - left: Blue Rock Springs Creek

Rindler Creek is a stream that rises on Sulfur Springs Mountain in southwestern Solano County, California. A stream restoration project has been conducted to reverse the damage of cattle overgrazing. One goal of this project is to enhance habitat suitable for the endangered Northern Red-legged Frog. Water quality has been altered in Rindler Creek due to historic cinnabar extraction in this watershed.

Cinnabar deposits were mined from this locale in the early 1900s via Hastings Mine and St. John's Mine. Shaft construction occurred no earlier than 1918 and mining had ceased by the year 1930.

== See also ==
- Blue Rock Springs Creek
- List of watercourses in the San Francisco Bay Area
- Serpentine soil
