= Ted Albrecht =

American football player (born 1954)

No. 64
- Position: Offensive tackle

Personal information
- Born: October 8, 1954 (age 72); Harvey, Illinois, U.S.
- Listed height: 6 ft 4 in (1.93 m)
- Listed weight: 253 lb (115 kg)

Career information
- High school: Vallejo (CA)
- College: California
- NFL draft: 1977: 1st round, 15th overall pick

Career history
- Chicago Bears (1977–1981)

Awards and highlights
- PFWA All-Rookie Team (1977); First-team All-American (1976); 2× First-team All-Pac-8 (1975, 1976); Chicagoland Sports Hall of Fame

Career NFL statistics
- Games played: 77
- Games started: 75
- Fumble recoveries: 1
- Stats at Pro Football Reference

Theodore Carl Albrecht (born October 8, 1954) is an American former professional football player who was an offensive tackle for six seasons (1977-1982) for the Chicago Bears of the National Football League (NFL). He played college football for the California Golden Bears 1973-1976. Albrecht currently serves as a color analyst for Northwestern University football broadcasts on WGN (AM) radio.

== Early life and education ==
Albrecht was born in Harvey, Illinois and moved with his family to northern California at the age of 3. He played football at Vallejo High School in Vallejo, California and where he earned enshrinement in the first class of Vallejo Sports HOF. He has five siblings and one of his younger brothers Bob, played on the National Championship football team for the USC Trojans

== College career ==
Albrecht studied sociology at the University of California, Berkeley, where he started 33 straight games at offensive tackle. Two time All Pac-8 Conference tackle. Made several All-America teams and appeared on the 1976 Bob Hope's Christmas show with the Associated Press All-America Team. Following his Sr Year, he Played in four post season All-Star games: North-South and East West Shrine Games, Hula Bowl and Japan Bowl. He was enshrined to class of 2000 in the University of Calif. Athletic Sports Hall of Fame.

== Pro football career ==
Albrecht was chosen in the first-round and 15th player overall of the 1977 NFL draft, and he played six seasons for the Chicago Bears as an offensive lineman. He made the All-Rookie team in 1977 and was a Pro Bowl alternate in 1979. And blocked for the great HOF running back # 34 "Sweetness", Walter Payton. Following his 1977 rookie season he was voted by his teammates as the eighth recipient of the Brian Piccolo Award.

Ultimately, Albrecht's back injury ended his career early, and he announced his retirement at age 28 in August 1983.

== After football ==
After retiring, Albrecht founded a travel agency, Albrecht Travel Systems 1983, also began providing color commentary of Northwestern University football in 1994.Albrecht continues to do color commentary during Northwestern football broadcasts for 33 years.Following his playing career he was enshrined to the Chicago Sports HOF. One of his favorite quotes: "I blocked for two of the greatest running backs of all time: Cal great and former All America Chuck Muncie (#42), and Bear great and NFL HOF running back Water "Sweetness" Payton"!.

== Personal ==
Albrecht lives in Winnetka, Illinois. Albrecht had two daughters from a previous marriage, and two stepchildren with his current marriage with Marie of 20 years.
