= Bob Parlocha =

American jazz musician

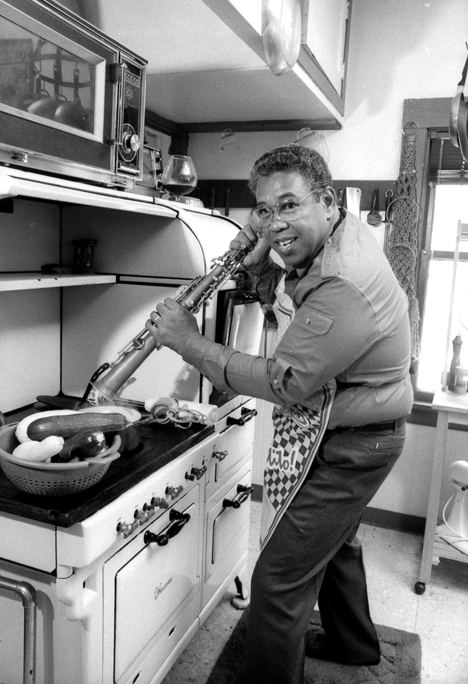
Jazz Radio host Bob Parlocha at his Oakland home, 9/16/86.

Robert "Bob" Parlocha (April 18, 1938 – March 15, 2015) was an American jazz expert who was best known as a radio host and programmer. He was also a professional saxophone player and gourmet cook. He was in wide syndication with his nighttime jazz show Jazz With Bob Parlocha.

== Local journey to success ==
Bob Parlocha was born in Solano, California, in 1938, to Maria Carter and Carlos Parlocha. His father was Filipino American and his mother half-black, half-Filipino. Parlocha's maternal grandparents, George Washington Carter Jr. and María Martínez, left their farm in the Philippines to settle in Vallejo, California; George Carter, a Louisiana native, had served as a Buffalo Soldier during the Spanish–American War.

Raised in Vallejo, Parlocha was introduced to jazz at an early age by his mother, a fan of big band music (especially Count Basie and Duke Ellington). He grew up listening to former KJAZ owner Pat Henry (broadcasting at that time on KROW in San Francisco); and to Jerry Dean, who hosted a weekly KJAZ show from Vallejo. Contributing his voice as an announcer for road bands while still in his teens, Bob played tenor and soprano saxophones, as well as flute for his high school band. He graduated from Vallejo High School in 1956.

Jazz remained a hobby for the next decade, while he worked as a psychiatric nurse at UCSF. He later attributed many of the interpersonal skills he employed in the music business to this experience. KJAZ owner Pat Henry's on-air invitation to prospective DJs led Parlocha to submit a tape, prompting Henry to hire him as a programmer for the station's Saturday evenings. This resulted in Parlocha's appointment as host of the "Dinner Jazz Show," in 1978.

As the show's ratings climbed, Parlocha's distinctive voice became familiar to jazz audiences throughout the Bay Area. A thoughtful programmer, articulate spokesman for jazz, and analyst of the music scene, his "master of ceremonies" style enhanced many jazz concerts and fundraisers over the subsequent years. His credits include the Gil Evans Orchestra's concert at the Pacific Coast Collegiate Jazz Festival, the Berkeley Jazz Festival, Oakland Arts Explosion, Jazz at the Palace, Bay Area Jazz Awards, the San Francisco International KJAZ Festival, and as KJAZ host on the SS Norway Jazz Cruises.

== Music director and producer ==
He eventually became music director at KJAZ, auditioning new releases and determining which albums and cuts would air on the prominent jazz station. KJAZ was one of only a handful of jazz stations nationally reporting airplay to the prestigious "Radio and Records" publication, which influenced programming at hundreds of smaller stations and, ultimately, record sales.

He also developed numerous specialty shows, including the Black Masters series; Latin Jazz; On The Scene (spotlighting Bay Area musicians in live performance); and What's New, reviewing album releases with a Bay Area panel of experts. Parlocha engineered the late Martha Young's album Live at Bajone's on the Carnelian label, and Sufi Dancers for pianist Steve Cohn, both in 1982. He also produced a number of albums; his first in 1985 was singer Laurie Antonioli's "Soul Eyes" on Catero Records.

== Syndication ==
A decline in jazz radio audiences led KJAZ owner Ron Cowan to sell the ailing station in 1994. A leading fine arts station in Chicago, WFMT (through JSN, its satellite radio affiliate), agreed to syndicate the show Jazz with Bob Parlocha, which he recorded from his home in Alameda, California. The evening show was picked up by KUVO (Denver), WRCJ-FM (Detroit) and several other public radio stations, including Kansas and Alabama. WGBH-FM, in Boston, Massachusetts, has carried the show for decades, albeit with some glitches in their transition to "mostly talk" radio in 2009. The leading jazz station in the western United States, KKJZ (Long Beach), began airing his program in early 2007. The show is also carried by JAZZ.FM91 in Toronto, Ontario, as well as the de facto successor to KJAZ, KCSM (FM) of the College of San Mateo in the Bay Area.

Within 4 months following his death, KKJZ dropped Bob's recorded syndicated programming, with Bob's playlists on WFMT's website also disappearing in that time period.

WFMT continues to offer a Jazz overnight service with hosts Dee Alexander, John Hill, Dave Schwan, and Neil Tesser.

== Other activities ==
Parlocha participated in the Jazz Journalist Association Awards and donated his time to jazz causes, especially those in support of Bay Area musicians. He also performed as a saxophonist, appearing regularly with the Bob Enos big band, Soundwave, at Rooster's Roadhouse in Alameda and in events such as at the 2008 San Jose Jazz Festival.

He also enjoyed gourmet cooking as a hobby. His Cooking With Bob column appeared in the bimonthly KJAZ newsletters, and he performed numerous live remotes from Bay Area restaurants on "Dinner Jazz."
