= Bob Coronado =

American football player (born 1936)

No. 46
- Position: Wide receiver

Personal information
- Born: May 22, 1936; Vallejo, California, U.S.
- Died: September 29, 2023 (aged 87); Benicia, California, U.S.
- Listed height: 6 ft 2 in (1.88 m)
- Listed weight: 195 lb (88 kg)

Career information
- High school: Vallejo
- College: Pacific (1957–1958)
- NFL draft: 1959: 10th round, 116th overall pick

Career history
- Pittsburgh Steelers (1961)

Career NFL statistics
- Receptions: 3
- Receiving yards: 32
- Stats at Pro Football Reference

Robert Harvey Coronado (May 22, 1936 – September 29, 2023) was an American professional football player who played for Pittsburgh Steelers of the National Football League (NFL).

He played college football at the University of the Pacific.

Coronado died on September 29, 2023 in Benicia, California, at the age of 87.
