= USS Vallejo =

Multiple ships of the United States Navy have been named USS Vallejo in honor of Vallejo, California.

- USS Vallejo (CL-112) was planned as a Fargo-class cruiser, but her construction was canceled 5 October 1944.
- USS Vallejo (PG-205) was a Tacoma-class patrol gunboat, but was reclassified as patrol frigate PF-97 on 15 April 1943 and renamed USS Lorain on 19 November 1943. Her contract was canceled 11 January 1944 before she was laid down.
- USS Vallejo (CL-146) was laid down as a Worcester-class cruiser on 16 July 1945; however, her construction was canceled on 8 December 1945, and her hulk was subsequently scrapped.

== See also ==
- USS Mariano G. Vallejo (SSBN-658) was a Benjamin Franklin-class fleet ballistic missile submarine.
