= Bobby Reed (gridiron football) =

American gridiron football player (born 1939)

- Reed, 1963

Profile
- Positions: Halfback, return specialist, wide receiver

Personal information
- Born: November 14, 1939; New Orleans
- Died: September 26, 2025 (aged 85); Saratoga Springs, New York, U.S.
- Listed height: 5 ft 11 in (1.80 m)
- Listed weight: 187 lb (85 kg)

Career information
- High school: Vallejo (CA)
- College: Pacific

Career history
- Minnesota Vikings (1962–1963); Winnipeg Blue Bombers (1964); Toronto Argonauts (1965); Wheeling Ironmen (CoFL, 1965); Brooklyn Dodgers (CoFL, 1966); Los Angeles Rams (1967)*; Cleveland Browns (1967)*; Akron Vulcans (CoFL, 1967); Hartford Charter Oaks (CoFL, 1967); Long Island Bulls (ACFL, 1969–1970); Jersey Jays (ACFL, 1970)
- * Offseason or practice squad member only
- Stats at Pro Football Reference

Robert "Bobby" Reed (November 14, 1939 – September 26, 2025) was an American football halfback, return specialist, and wide receiver. He played college football for the Pacific Tigers and professional football for the Minnesota Vikings (1962–1963) of the National Football League (NFL) and the Winnipeg Blue Bombers (1964) and Toronto Argonauts (1965) of the Canadian Football League (CFL).

== Early life ==
A native of New Orleans, he attended Vallejo High School in Vallejo, California. He played college football at Solano Community College and the University of the Pacific in Stockton, California.

== Professional football ==
=== Minnesota Vikings ===
Reed signed as a free agent with the Minnesota Vikings in 1962. He won a spot with his "breakaway kick returns" in exhibition games. During the regular season, he appeared in the first six games and was used principally as a return specialist, averaging 9.1 yards on nine punt returns and 25.9 yards on 13 kickoff returns. He started at wide receiver the third game of the season vs. the San Francisco 49ers and scored his only NFL touchdown on a 37-yard pass from Fran Tarkenton. He sustained a chest injury in the sixth game at Los Angeles and missed the remainder of the season.

In January 1963, he signed a new one-year contract with the Vikings. He served a six-month tour of duty in the Army between the 1962 and 1963 seasons. In the 1963 season, he appeared in 10 games and tallied 683 all-purpose yards: 367 yards on 13 kickoff returns (28.2-yard average); 91 yards on 9 punt returns (10.1-yard average); 137 receiving yards on 11 receptions (10.5-yard average); and 88 rushing yards on 21 carries (4.2-yard average).

Reed was the fastest player on the team during his time with the Vikings, but he was cut in August 1964, reportedly due to his inability to hang onto passes.

=== Canadian and Continental Football Leagues ===
After being cut by the Vikings, Reed signed with the Winnipeg Blue Bombers of the CFL. He appeared in 10 games for Winnipeg during the 1964 season, totaling 307 rushing yards, 249 receiving yards, and 487 kickoff return yards. Winnipeg head coach Bud Grant said at the time, "He has done the 100 in 9.4. He can fly."

In 1965, Reed joined the Ottawa Roughriders in the 1965 preseason, but was released on waivers and picked up by the Toronto Argonauts. He appeared in two games for the Argonauts, rushing 11 times for 30 yards and catching two passes for 45 yards.

Reed also played several years in the Continental Football League (1965–1967) and the Atlantic Coast Football League (1969–1970). While playing for the Brooklyn Dodgers in the Continental League in 1966, he became a wide receiver and caught 72 passes for and 18.7-yard average and 13 touchdowns. His performance at Brooklyn drew attention from NFL clubs, and he spent time with the Los Angeles Rams and Cleveland Browns during the 1967 preseason.

== Personal life and death ==
Reed was inducted into the Vallejo Sports Hall of Fame in 2010.

Reed died on September 26, 2025.
