= Greg Blankenship =

American gridiron football player (born 1954)

No. 57, 53
- Position: Linebacker

Personal information
- Born: March 24, 1954 (age 72); Vallejo, California, U.S.
- Listed height: 6 ft 2 in (1.88 m)
- Listed weight: 220 lb (100 kg)

Career information
- High school: Vallejo
- College: Cal State Hayward
- NFL draft: 1976: undrafted

Career history
- Oakland Raiders (1976); Pittsburgh Steelers (1976)

Career NFL statistics
- Games played: 10
- Games started: 1
- Stats at Pro Football Reference

Gregory Allen Blankenship (born March 24, 1954) is an American former professional football player who was a linebacker for one season in the National Football League (NFL) with the Oakland Raiders and Pittsburgh Steelers. He played college football for the Cal State Hayward Pioneers.

== Early life ==
Blankenship was born in Vallejo, California and attended Vallejo High School.

== College career ==
He matriculated at California State University, Hayward, (since renamed California State University, East Bay). As a sophomore, Blankenship was named to the third-team Associated Press small college All-America football team in 1973. In 1974, he was named to the UPI Little All-Coast football team. After his senior season he was named to the Associated Press College Division All-America team as a first-team selection.

Blankenship has been inducted into the California State University, East Bay Athletics Hall of Fame.

== Professional career ==
Blankenship went undrafted in the 1976 NFL draft, but was signed by the Oakland Raiders. He played four games for the Raiders before being cut.

He was picked up by the Steelers about a month later, primarily to serve as a special teams player. He played for the Steelers in the final six games of the 1976 season.

Blankenship was cut by the Steelers prior to the 1977 season. He was picked up in 1978 by the British Columbia Lions of the Canadian Football League.
