= Starting Gate School =

Location
- 579 Couch St. Vallejo, California 94590; United States; 38.12694°N 122.25192°W

Information
- Type: Private, Coeducational
- Established: 1972, 2009
- Founder: Genevieve M. Reignierd
- Closed: June 30, 2020
- Principal: Lisa Bogel
- Grades: K-12
- Enrollment: 100 (2012-2013 school year)
- Campus type: Urban
- Colors: Blue, and White
- Team name: Eagles
- Website: http://www.startinggateschool.com/ (archived on July 23, 2019)

Starting Gate was a co-educational non-profit private school in Vallejo, California, encompassing kindergarten through 12th grade with a separate preschool facility. It opened in the 1970s and closed in 2020.

== School ==
Starting Gate School encompassed kindergarten through 12th grade, with a separate preschool. Class sizes were limited to 10; enrollment was approximately 50 in 2011 and 58 in 2013 (with approximately 30 in preschool).

The school held a book drive for a library in 2012; it was named in honor of Jim Capoot, a Vallejo police officer who was killed in the line of duty in 2011, and students also raised money to make a donation to his widow and erect a sign as a memorial to him.

== History ==
The school began in 1972 with a day care center opened by Genevieve M. Reignierd for a local Episcopalian church, shortly followed by teaching in her home. Reignierd was a high school and college teacher who developed an educational methodology based in part on the theories of Maria Montessori and Jean Piaget; Reignierd School expanded grade by grade and in 1976 added a pre-school in a then dilapidated house. Reignierd's son Steven Reignierd became principal.

Reignierd School was housed for a year in the day care center at Saint Catherine of Siena Church, and after an opportunity to buy a school campus fell through, moved to Friendship Missionary Baptist Church and then acquired another dilapidated building, which accommodated all the K–12 years. Following Genevieve Reignierd's death in 2008, it was reorganized as an educational non-profit under the name Starting Gate School, with support from the D'lonier Foundation, established by the family of Reignierd's mother. The school was registered under its new name with the California Department of Education in January 2010. In 2009 Starting Gate moved to facilities rented from Friendship Missionary Baptist Church on the historic U.S. Route 40. The church sought in 2013 to terminate the lease as unprofitable.

Steven Reignierd died in 2016. David Reignierd, Genevieve Reignierd's grandson, and Lisa Bogel subsequently served as principal. The school closed in June 2020.
