= Vallejo City Unified School District =

School district in California

Address
- 665 Walnut Avenue Vallejo, California, 94592; United States

District information
- Type: Public
- Grades: K–12
- Superintendent: Rubén Aurelio
- NCES District ID: 0640740

Students and staff
- Students: 9,653 (2024–25)
- Teachers: 424.38 (FTE)
- Staff: 682.04 (FTE)
- Student–teacher ratio: 22.75:1

Other information
- Website: www.vcusd.org

Vallejo City Unified School District is a K-12 school district in Vallejo in the U.S. state of California, serving approximately 9,300 students as of December 2025. Following declining enrollment and financial problems, the district was under state oversight from 2004 to 2025, and has closed and consolidated schools. As of January 2026, it comprises ten elementary schools, four middle schools (one a dependent Charter school), two comprehensive high schools, three alternative school programs, and an adult school; three elementary schools are scheduled to close at the end of the 2025–26 school year.

== History ==
The district originated as separate elementary and high school districts governed jointly by the city board of education. In January 1945, Vallejo City Unified School District was authorized to open a four-year junior college. Vallejo Junior College was established that year and became a two-year college in 1955. In 1967 it was moved to Fairfield and renamed Solano Community College.

In the 21st century, the Vallejo City Unified School District has had a continuing budget deficit and declining enrollment. After the funding shortfall exceeded $18 million, in 2004 it was placed in receivership by the State of California, receiving a $60 million loan and being placed under fiscal oversight by the Department of Education. Richard Damelio was appointed administrator, and oversaw all district operations until 2007. Partial control was then restored to the school board, with Damelio continuing to oversee finances until April 2013. Melvin Iizuka was then appointed as a fiscal advisor to the district by the Solano County Office of Education. Repayment of the loan was completed in September 2024 and oversight ended in July 2025, but enrollment meanwhile had declined by almost half, falling from approximately 18,000 in 2004 to approximately 9,300 by late 2025.

To save money, in spring 2004, prior to entering receivership the district eliminated elementary school music teachers, middle school counselors, and librarians, and closed Mare Island Elementary School. Since 2004 it has continued to combine and close schools and reduce staff. Farragut and Davidson Elementary School, Vallejo Middle School, and Hogan High School were closed by Damelio. Elsa Widenmann Elementary School and Solano Middle School were merged in 2019 to create Solano Widenmann Leadership Academy. In 2020, Beverly Hills Elementary School and Benjamin Franklin Middle School were closed, and Farragut Leadership Academy was relocated to the John Finney Educational Complex. At the end of the 2024–25 academic year, the district closed two elementary schools, Mare Island Fitness and Health Academy and Loma Vista Environmental Science Academy, and in December 2025 it announced that three more would close at the end of the 2025–26 academic year. Little League fields and an elementary school campus have been sold.

Rubén Aurelio has been the district superintendent since July 2024.

== Schools ==
As of January 2026, the Vallejo City Unified School District includes ten elementary schools, four middle schools (one a dependent Charter school), and two high schools. The district also has four alternative public education schools or programs including an adult school.

=== Elementary schools ===
- Cooper Elementary
- Federal Terrace Elementary
- Glen Cove Elementary
- Highland Elementary (to close in 2026)
- Lincoln Elementary (to close in 2026)
- Dan Mini Elementary
- Grace Patterson Elementary
- Annie Pennycook Elementary (to close in 2026)
- Steffan Manor Elementary
- Wardlaw Elementary

=== Middle schools ===
- Cave Language Academy (TK–8)
- Hogan Middle School (until 2011, Springstowne Middle School)
- Solano Widenmann Leadership Academy (TK-8; formerly Solano Middle School)
- Vallejo Charter School (TK–8; dependent charter)

=== High schools ===
- Vallejo High School
- Jesse M. Bethel High School

=== Alternative schools ===
- John Finney Educational Complex
  - Everest Academy (6–13)
  - John Finney High School
  - Independent Study Academy
- Vallejo Adult School
