= Vallejo High School =

Vallejo Senior High School
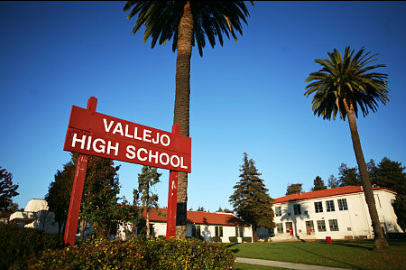

Location
- 840 Nebraska Street; Vallejo, California 94590; United States; 38°6′51″N 122°14′40″W

Information
- Established: 1869
- School district: Vallejo City Unified School District
- Principal: Beyonka Marshall
- Teaching staff: 63.51 (FTE)
- Grades: 9-12
- Gender: Coeducational
- Student to teacher ratio: 18.78
- Language: English
- Hours in school day: Mon, Tue, Thu, Fri, : 8:30 a.m. to 3:27 p.m. Wed: 8:30 a.m. to 2:30 p.m.
- Campus size: Mid Size
- Colors: Red; White
- Song: Vallejo Alma Mater
- Athletics conference: Solano County Athletic Conference (SCAC) in Division II of the Sac-Joaquin Section
- Sports: Badminton; Baseball; Basketball; Cross Country; Football; Golf; Soccer; Softball; Swimming; Tennis; Track & Field; Volleyball; Water Polo; Wrestling
- Mascot: Redhawks
- Rival: Jesse Bethel High School
- Website: https://www.vcusd.org/vhs

Vallejo High School is a high school located in Vallejo, California. It is part of the Vallejo City Unified School District and has been in the heart of Vallejo for more than 100 years. It currently serves the west side of the city (west of Interstate 80).

In February 2014, the School's mascot was changed from the Apaches to Redhawks. This was due to the controversy revolving around the use of the name of a Native American tribe as a mascot.

== Academies ==
Referred to as the "Wall-to-Wall Academies", each academy is a unique, small learning community. As freshman, students are automatically placed into the 9th Grade Academy with classes located on the former Vallejo Middle School Campus. In tenth grade, students choose an academy to remain in based on individual college/career interests. Several of these academies features Career and Technical Education (CTE) courses. Beginning with the class of 2016, all students have been required to be in an academy.

- Biotechnology Academy
- Green Engineering Academy and Robotics (GEAR)
- Health and Fitness Academy
- Hospitality Academy
- Visual and Performing Arts Academy

== Notable alumni ==
- Ted Albrecht, former NFL offensive tackle, Chicago Bears
- Brandon Armstrong, former professional basketball player
- Dick Bass, former football running back who played for the Los Angeles Rams from 1960 to 1969
- Norm Bass, former college and professional baseball and football player
- Greg Blankenship, former NFL player for the Oakland Raiders and Pittsburgh Steelers
- Vic Bottari, football player
- Raymond Burr, actor
- Joey Chestnut, competitive eater
- Bill Corbus, football guard
- Bob Coronado, former NFL wide receiver, Pittsburgh Steelers
- Rockmond Dunbar, actor
- E-40, Musician
- Pete Escovedo, Mexican-American musician percussionist
- David Estrada, robotics and autonomous vehicle lawyer
- Charley Fuller, former NFL running back, Oakland Raiders
- Augie Garrido, head coach in NCAA Division I college baseball
- Tonee Hayes, rapper known as Nef the Pharaoh
- Damon Hollins, former Major League Baseball outfielder
- Gregory Allen Howard, award-winning Hollywood screenwriter (Remember the Titans, Ali, Harriet)
- Earsell Mackbee, former NFL cornerback, Minnesota Vikings
- Mike Merriweather, former Pittsburgh Steelers and Minnesota Vikings 3x Pro Bowl linebacker
- Mark Muñoz, 2x California state champion wrestler; 2x NCAA D-1 All-American at OSU; professional mixed martial artist fighter who competed in the UFC
- DeMarcus Nelson, professional basketball player
- Bob Parlocha, jazz expert who is best known as a radio host and programmer
- Dave Plump, football player
- Bobby Reed, former NFL halfback, Minnesota Vikings
- Rashad Ross, National Football League wide receiver
- CC Sabathia, Major League Baseball pitcher with New York Yankees and member of the National Baseball Hall of Fame
- Sly Stone, musician with Sly & the Family Stone
- Joe Thurston, professional baseball utility player for Leones de Yucatán of Mexican League
- Rob Wainwright, professional basketball player

== 1999 CIF Track and Field Champions ==
Paced by State Championships in the 400 Meter Relay and the 300 Meter Hurdles, Vallejo High School won the CIF Track and Field Championships. Rico Hatter won the 300 Meter Hurdles and finished 3rd in the 110 High Hurdles. Vallejo also finished 2nd in the 1600 Meter Relay.
