= St. John's Mine =

Former cinnabar mine near Vallejo, California, United States

Coordinates: 38.1519°N 122.1933°W

The St John's Mine is a mineral extraction site approximately three miles north of the city of Vallejo in Solano County, California, United States. The St John's site was used for extraction of cinnabar in the early 1900s. The St. John's Mine is classified as a medium priority mine from the standpoint of environmental oversight. The last inspection of the Hastings Mine occurred in 1997 and found only slight erosion of the considerable mine tailings; however the tailings exceed 10,000 cubic yards (7,600 m^{3}) of material, or one of the largest cinnabar tailings in the state of California. Furthermore, the drainage from St. John's Mine flows to receiving waters of Rindler Creek and thence to Lake Chabot. Miles of underground shafts were driven in the course of working the quicksilver deposits in the area. In 1989, Earth Metrics reviewed old 1918 maps of workings of the Hastings and St. John's Mines and found that mine shafts were not driven into the site prior to the year 1918.

== Environmental effects ==
Principal ongoing impact is from mercury contamination of spring water flowing beneath the site; moreover, historical analysis has shown that the volume of spring water itself has been greatly reduced from levels of a century ago. This reduction of spring flow has come about due to the extensive mine shafts driven to achieve the cinnabar extraction.

== See also ==
- Hayward Fault
- Hastings Mine
