= Hastings Mine =

Cinnabar resource in California

Coordinates: 38.12°N 122.17°W

The Hastings Mine is a mineral extraction site approximately 4.5 miles (7.2 km) northeast of the city of Vallejo, Solano County, California. The Hastings site on Sulfur Springs Mountain was used for extraction of cinnabar until the year 1930. The Hastings Mine is classified as a medium priority mine from the standpoint of environmental oversight. In the last inspection of the Hastings Mine in 1997, sediments in a drainage below the mine were found to contain ten parts per million of mercury; furthermore, spring water below the mine exhibited a water concentration of .31 micrograms per liter (a violation of the state of California standard for receiving waters of .05 micrograms per liter). Miles of underground shafts were driven in the course of working the quicksilver deposits in the area. In 1989, Earth Metrics reviewed old 1918 maps of workings of the Hastings and St. John's Mines and found that mine shafts were not driven into the site prior to the year 1918.

== Environmental effects ==
Principal ongoing impact is from mercury contamination of spring water flowing beneath the site; moreover, historical analysis has shown that the volume of spring water itself has been greatly reduced from levels of a century ago. This reduction of spring flow has come about due to the extensive mine shafts driven to achieve the cinnabar extraction.

== See also ==
- Hayward Fault
- New Almaden Mine
