= Vallejo, California =

- City
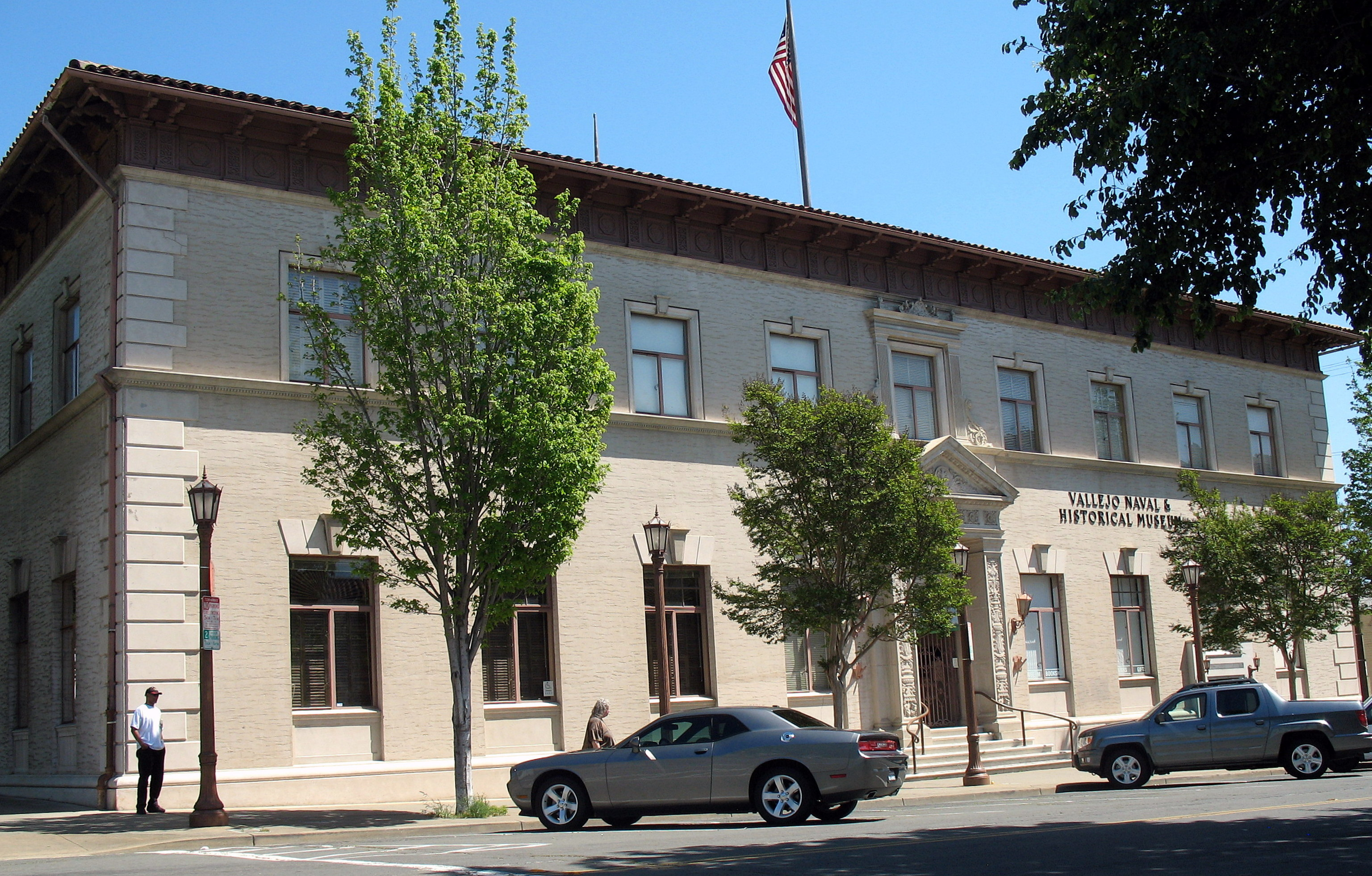
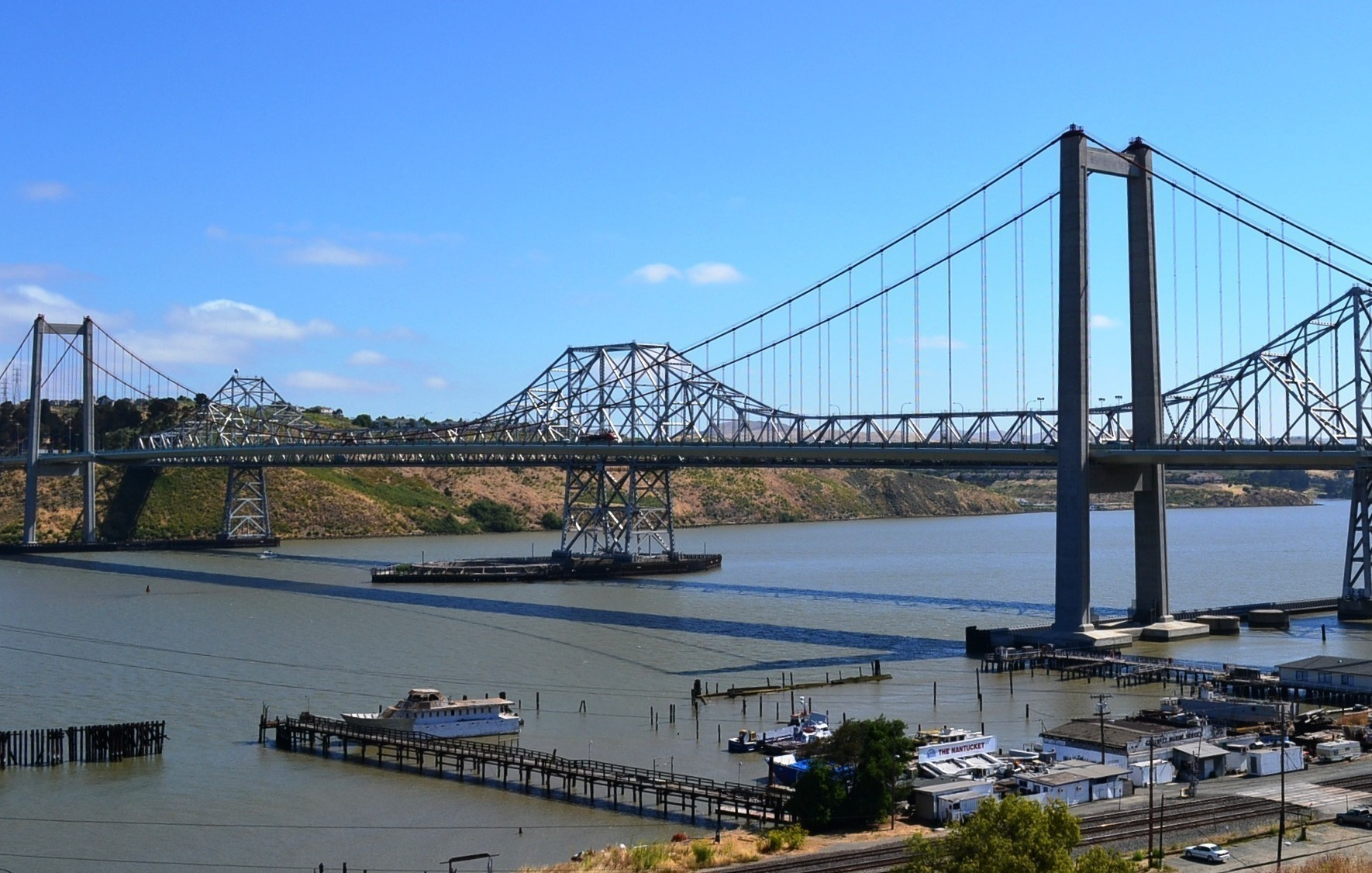
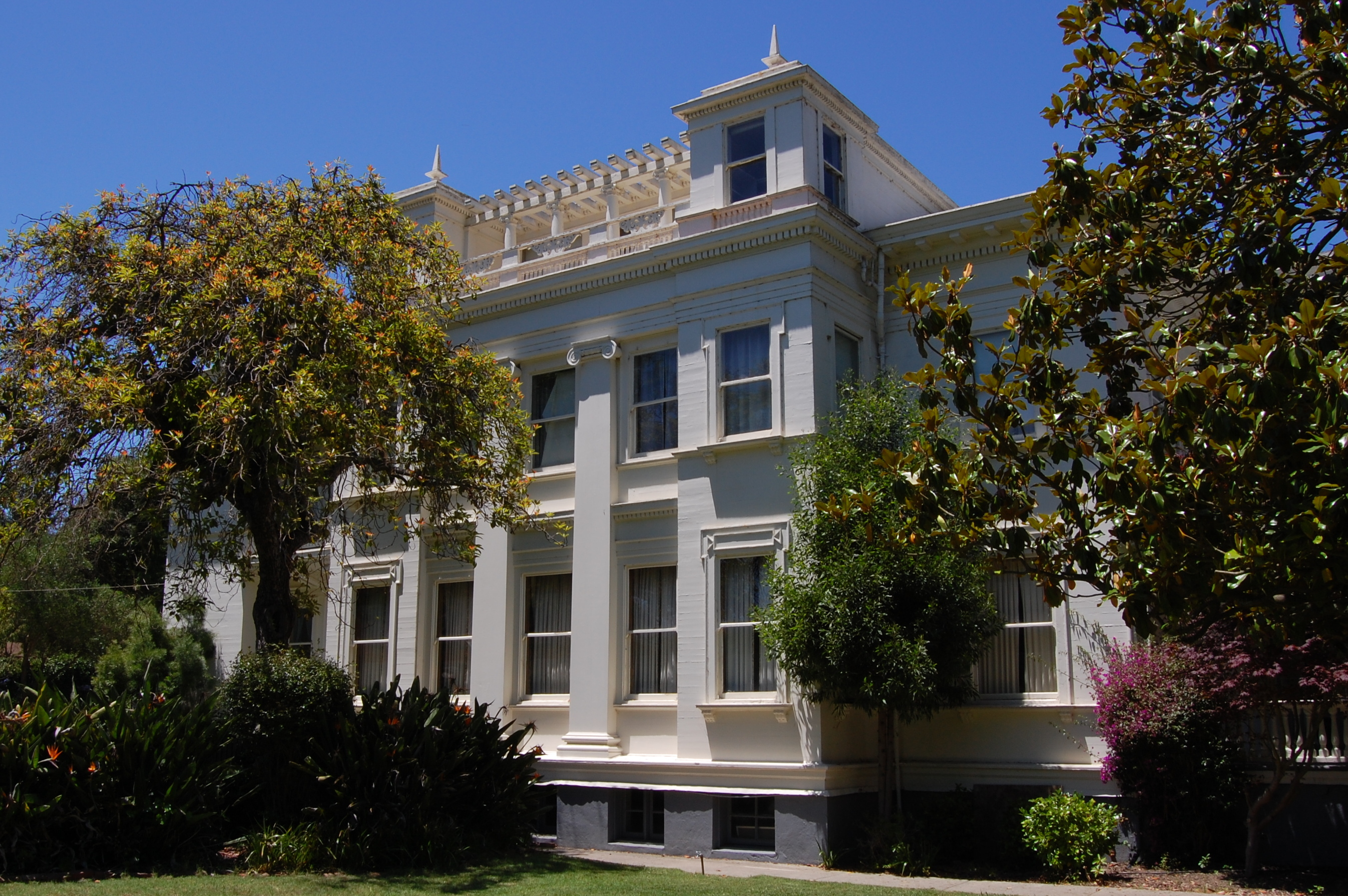
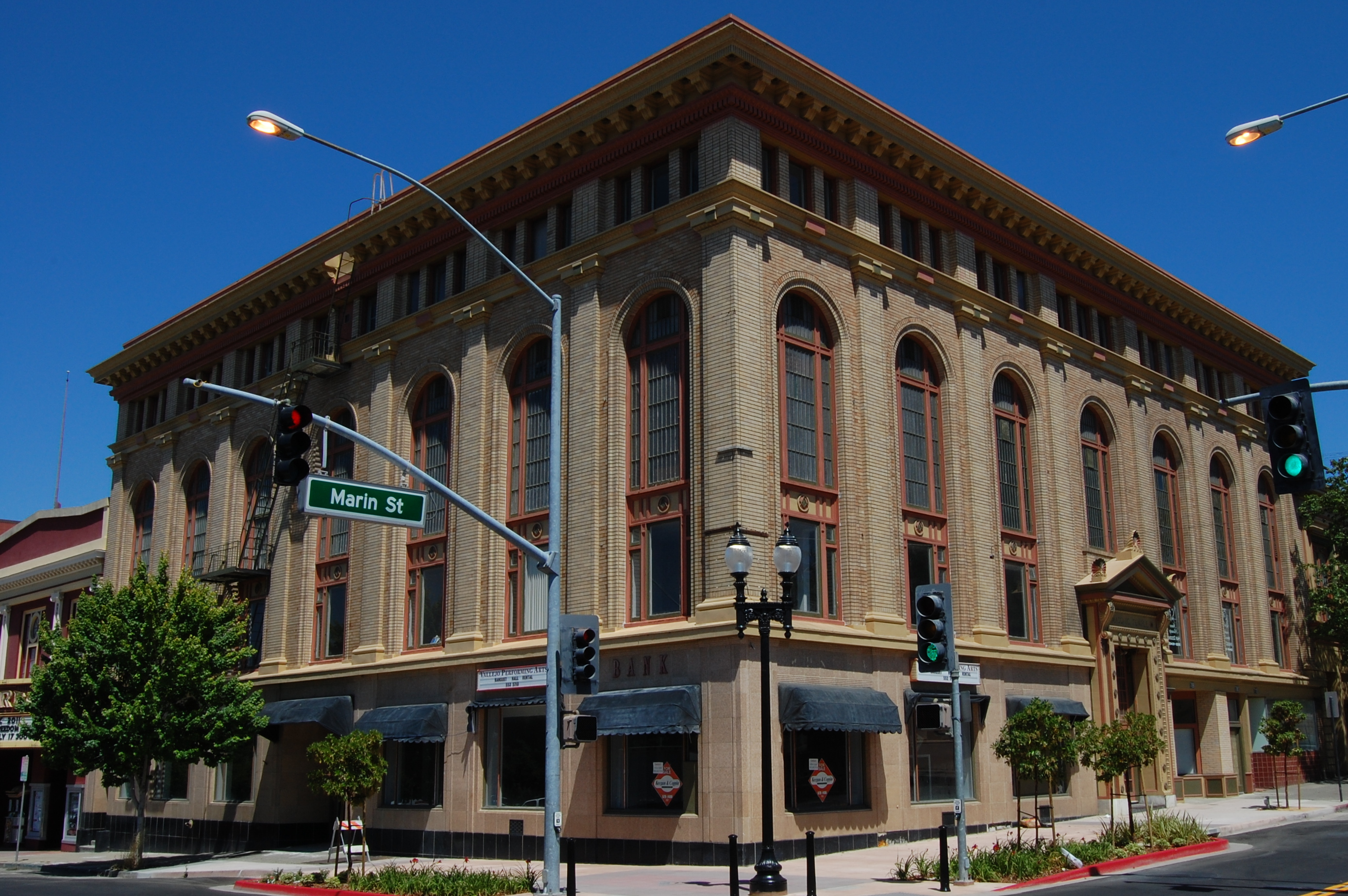
- Downtown Vallejo Vallejo Naval Museum Carquinez Bridge Mare Island Naval Shipyard Vallejo Masonic Temple

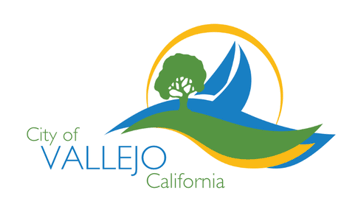
- Flag Logo
- Nicknames: V-Town, The Old Capital, Valley Joe
- Motto(s): City of Opportunity, The Naval City
- Interactive map of Vallejo, California
- Location in California Location in the United States
- Coordinates: 38°6′47″N 122°14′9″W
- Country: United States
- State: California
- Region: San Francisco Bay Area
- County: Solano
- Founded: 1851
- Incorporated: March 30, 1868
- Named for: Mariano Guadalupe Vallejo

Government
  - Type: Mayor-council
  - Mayor: Mayor Andrea Sorce; Vice-Mayor Peter Bregenzer (District 5); Alexander Matias (District 1); Diosdado "JR" Matulac (District 2); Dr. Tonia Lediju (District 3); Charles Palmares (District 4); Helen-Marie "Cookie" Gordon (District 6)
  - City manager: Harry Black
  - State senator: Christopher Cabaldon (D)
  - Assemblymember: Lori Wilson (D)
  - U. S. rep.: John Garamendi (D)

Area
  - City: 48.31 sq mi (125.11 km^{2})
  - Land: 30.42 sq mi (78.79 km^{2})
  - Water: 17.88 sq mi (46.32 km^{2}) 37.02%
- Elevation: 69 ft (21 m)

Population (2020)
  - City: 126,090
  - Estimate (2025): 123,287
  - Rank: 1st in Solano County; 50th in California
  - Density: 4,145/sq mi (1,600/km^{2})
  - Urban: 172,800
  - Metro: 455.376
  - Combined Statistical Area: San Francisco Bay Area
- Time zone: UTC−8 (Pacific)
  - Summer (DST): UTC−7 (PDT)
- ZIP Codes: 94589–94592
- Area code: 707, 369
- FIPS code: 06-81666
- GNIS feature IDs: 1661612, 2412142
- Website: cityofvallejo.net

Vallejo (/vəˈleɪ(h)oʊ/ və-LAY-(h)oh; Spanish pronunciation: [baˈʎexo]) is a city in Solano County, California, United States, and the second largest city in the North Bay region of the Bay Area. Located on the shores of San Pablo Bay, the city had a population of 126,090 at the 2020 United States census. Vallejo is home to the Cal Poly Maritime Academy, Touro University California, and Six Flags Discovery Kingdom.

Vallejo is named after Mariano Guadalupe Vallejo, the famed Californio general and statesman. The city was founded in 1851 on General Vallejo's Rancho Suscol to serve as the capital city of California, which it was from 1852 to 1853, after which the Californian government moved to neighboring Benicia, named in honor of Vallejo's wife Benicia Carrillo de Vallejo. The Mare Island Naval Shipyard was founded in 1854, and defined Vallejo's economy until the turn of the 21st century.

== History ==
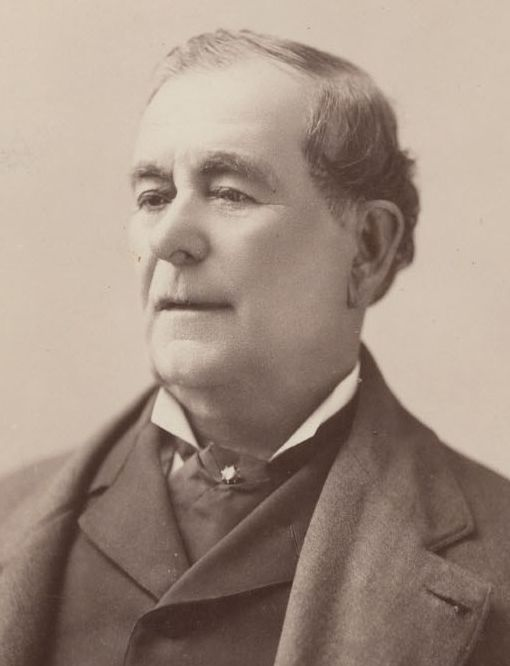
Vallejo is named after Don Mariano Guadalupe Vallejo, the famed Californio general and statesman. The city was founded on his Rancho Suscol.

Vallejo was once home of the Coast Miwok as well as Suisunes and other Patwin Native American tribes. There are three confirmed Native American sites located in the rock outcrops in the hills above Blue Rock Springs Park. The California Archaeological Inventory has indicated that the three Indian sites are located on Sulphur Springs Mountain.

=== Mexican era ===
The city of Vallejo was once part of the 84,000-acre (340 km^{2}) Rancho Suscol Mexican land grant of 1843 by Governor Manuel Micheltorena to Gen. Mariano Guadalupe Vallejo. The city was named after this Mexican military officer and title holder who was appointed in settling and overseeing the North Bay region. Gen. Vallejo was responsible for military peace in the region and founded the pueblo of Sonoma in 1836.

In 1846, independence-minded Anglo immigrants rose up against the Mexican government of California in what would be known as the Bear Flag Revolt which resulted in Gen. Vallejo's imprisonment in Sutter's Fort. This was subsequently followed by the annexation of the California Republic to the United States. Gen. Vallejo, though a Mexican army officer, generally acquiesced in the annexation of California to the United States, recognizing the greater resources of the United States and benefits that would bring to California.

=== Post-Conquest era ===
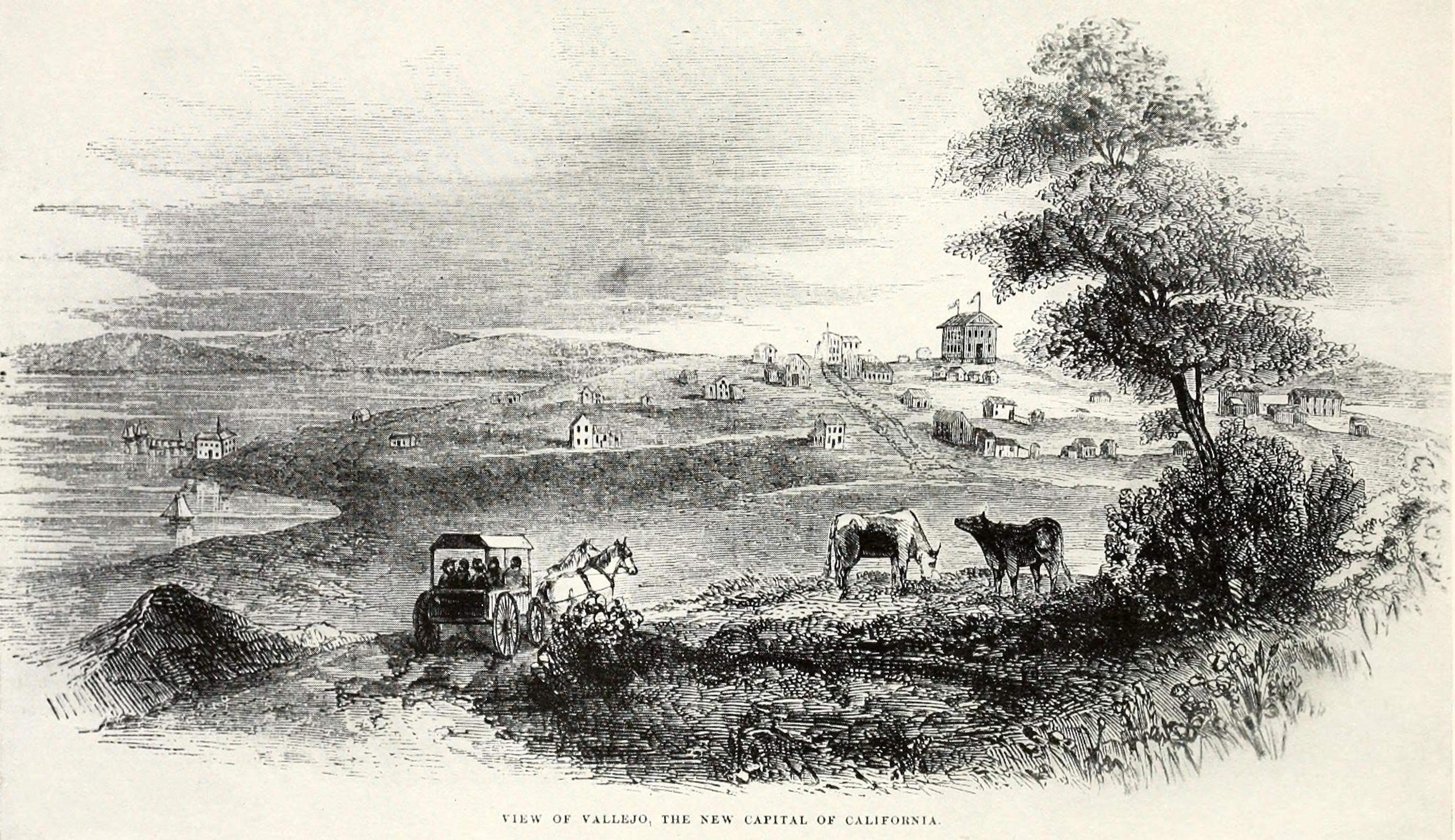
Vallejo c. 1852–53, when it served as the capital city of California and seat of the Californian government

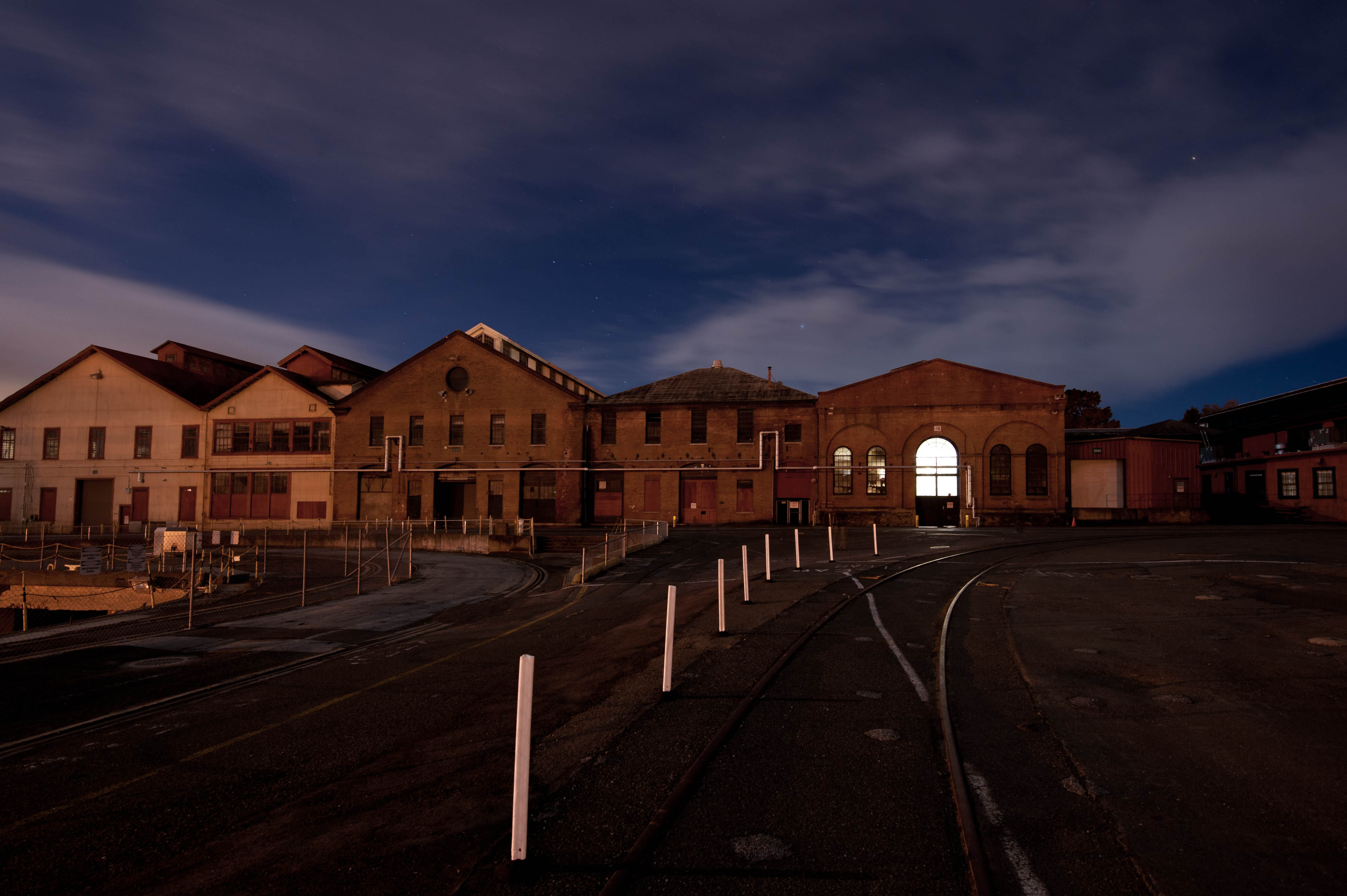
Founded in 1854, Mare Island was the first naval base on the West Coast.

In 1851, Vallejo was declared to become the official California State Capitol, with the new government prepared to meet for the first time the following year. In 1852, the legislature convened for the first time. However, Vallejo did not follow through with constructing a Capitol State Building for them to meet in. In 1853, it was again the meeting place for the legislature, solely for the purpose of moving the capitol officially to Benicia, which occurred on February 4, 1853, after only a month. Benicia is named after Vallejo's wife, Benicia de Vallejo. After the legislature left, the federal government established a naval shipyard on Mare Island, which helped the city overcome the loss. Due to the presence of the shipyard, Filipinos began to immigrate to Vallejo beginning in the first decades of the 20th century. The yard functioned for over a hundred years, finally closing in 1996.

The U.S. government appointed the influential Vallejo as Indian agent for Northern California. He also served on the state constitutional convention in 1849. Afterward, Vallejo remained active in state politics, but challenges to his land titles around Sonoma eventually left him impoverished and reduced his ranch from 250,000 acres to a mere 300. He eventually retired from public life, questioning the wisdom of his having welcomed the American acquisition of California in the first place. Vallejo died in 1890, a symbol of the eclipse of Californio wealth, power, and prestige.

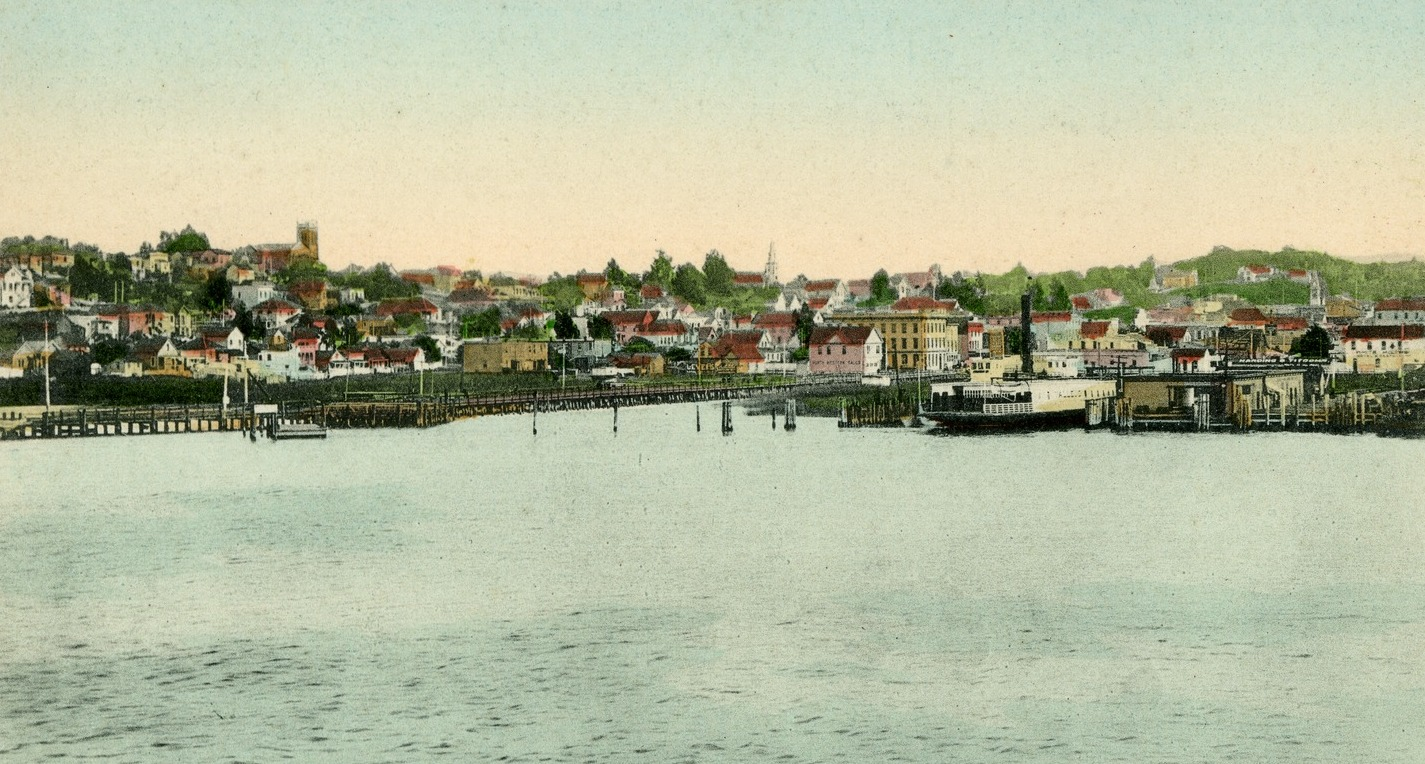
View of Vallejo in 1905

Although the town is named after General Vallejo, the man regarded as the true founder of Vallejo is General John B. Frisbie. Even before his daughter Epifania had formally married Frisbie, Vallejo had already granted him power of attorney over the land grant. It was Frisbie who hired E. H. Rowe, the man who designed the city layout and who named the east–west streets after states and the north–south streets after California counties.

=== Modern era ===
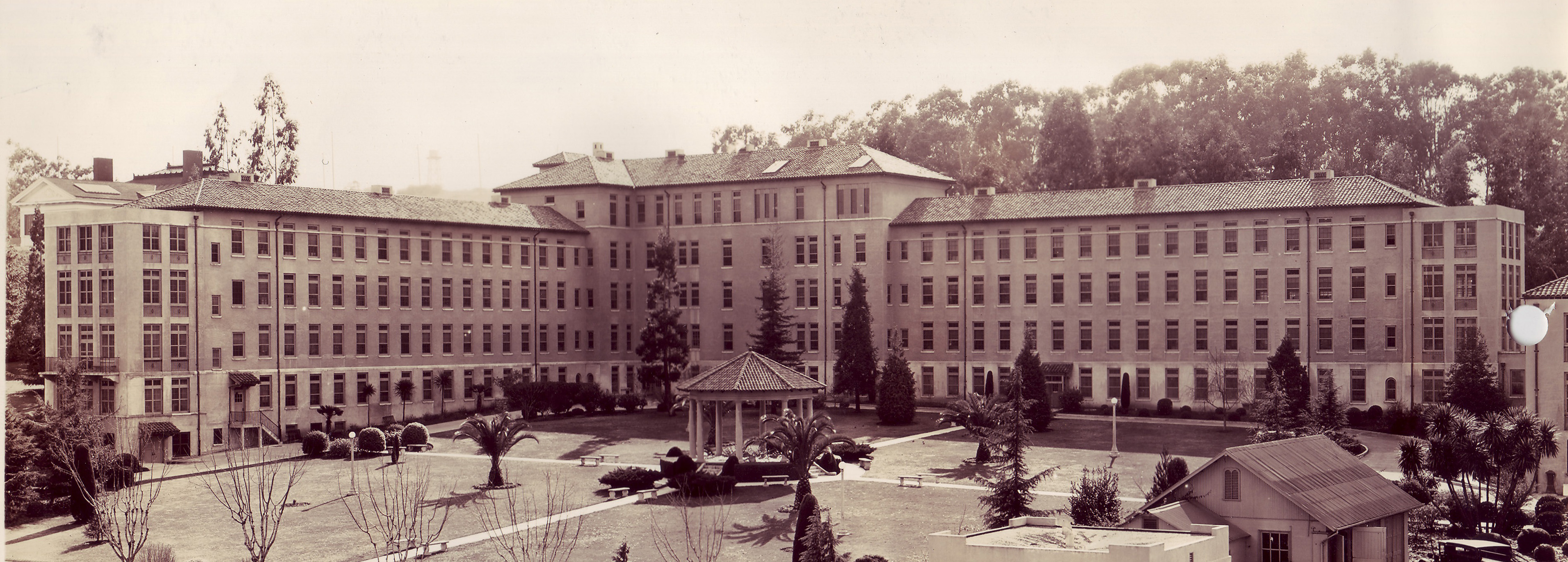
Mare Island Hospital in the 1920s

Mare Island Naval Shipyard was a critical submarine facility during WW II, both for constructing and overhauling vessels.

Downtown Vallejo retains many of its historic Victorian and Craftsman homes.

On May 6, 2008, the city council voted 7–0 to file for Chapter 9 bankruptcy, at the time becoming the largest California city to do so. Stephanie Gomes, Vallejo City Councilwoman, largely blamed exorbitant salaries and benefits for Vallejo firefighters and police officers. Reportedly, salaries and benefits for public safety workers accounted for at least 80 percent of Vallejo's general-fund budget. On November 1, 2011, a federal judge released Vallejo from bankruptcy after nearly three years.

== Geography ==
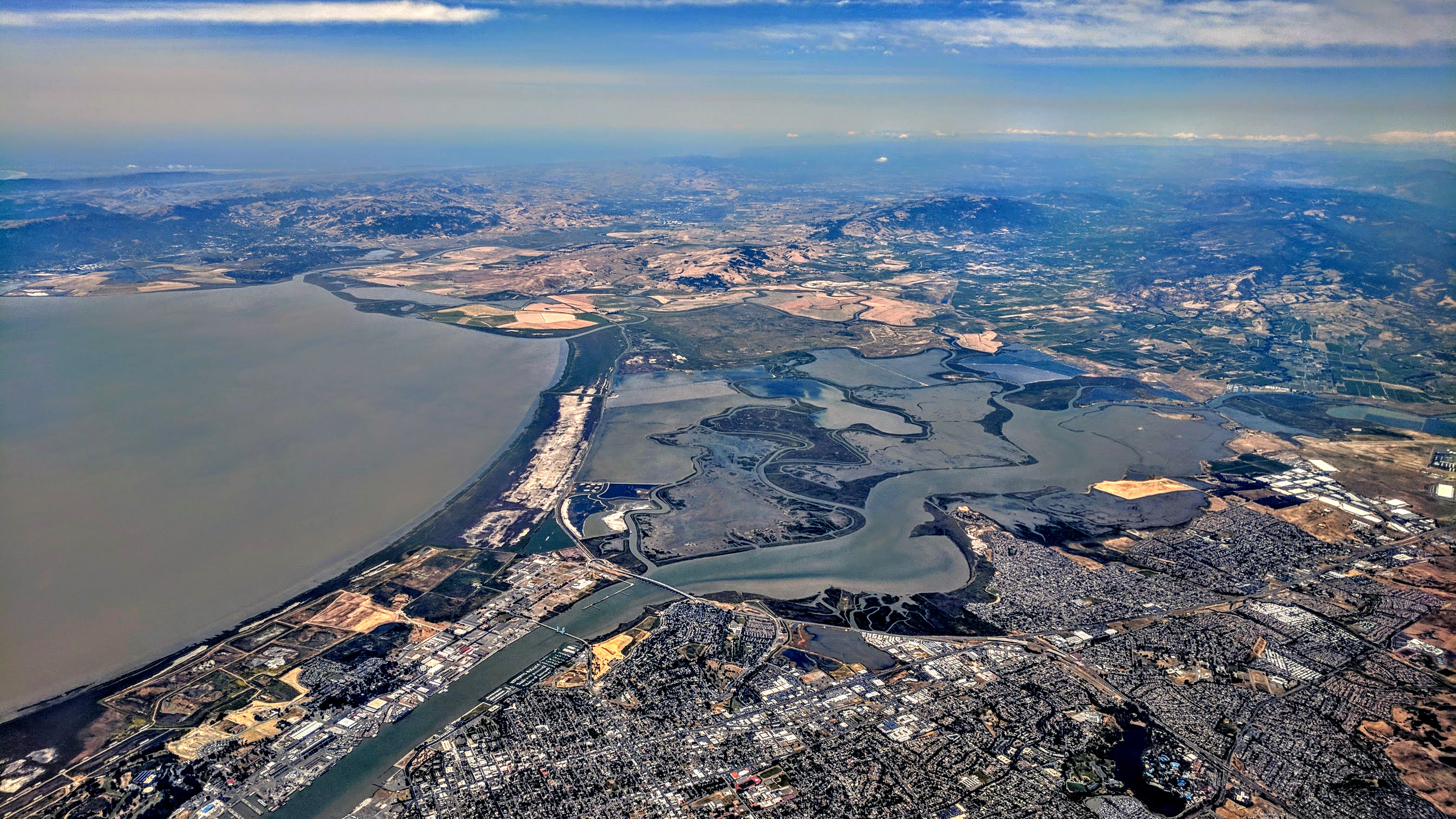
Aerial view of Vallejo, showing San Pablo Bay to the center left and the Napa River dividing mainland Vallejo from Mare Island in the bottom left

According to United States Census Bureau, the city has a total area of 48.3 square miles (125 km^{2}). Land area is 30.4 square miles (79 km^{2}), and 17.9 square miles (46 km^{2}) (37.02%) is water. The Napa River flows until it changes into the Mare Island Strait in Vallejo which then flows into San Pablo Bay, in the northeastern part of San Francisco Bay.

Vallejo is located on the southwestern edge of Solano County in the North Bay region of the San Francisco Bay Area in Northern California. Vallejo borders the city of Benicia to the east, American Canyon and the Napa county line to the north, the Carquinez Strait to the south and the San Pablo Bay to the west.

Several faults have been mapped in the vicinity of Vallejo. The San Andreas Fault and Hayward Faults are the most active faults, although the San Andreas is at some distance. Locally, the Sulphur Springs Valley Thrust Fault and Southampton Fault are found. No quaternary seismic activity along these minor faults has been observed with the possible exception of a slight offset revealed by trenching. The Sulphur Mountain and Green Valley faults have been associated with the Concord Fault to the south. The Concord Fault is considered active.

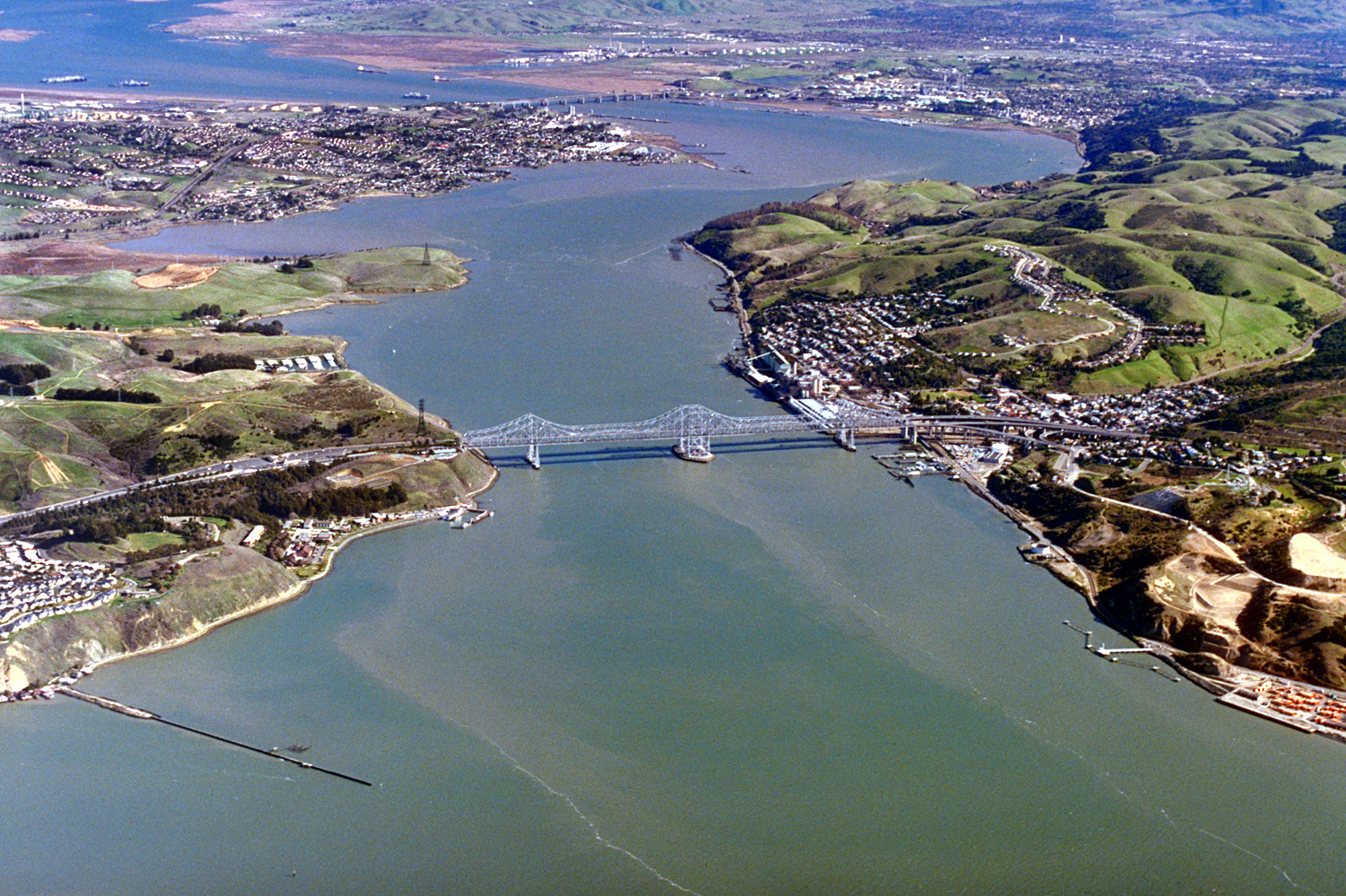
The Carquinez Bridge spans the Carquinez Strait, connecting Vallejo (left) to Contra Costa (right).

Historically there have been local cinnabar mines in the Vallejo area. The Hastings Mine and St. John's Mine contribute ongoing water contamination for mercury; furthermore, mine shaft development has depleted much of this area's spring water. Both Rindler Creek and Blue Rock Springs Creek have been affected.

=== Climate ===
Vallejo has a mild, coastal Mediterranean climate and can be an average of 10 °F (5.6 °C) cooler than nearby inland cities. Vallejo is influenced by its position on the northeastern shore of San Pablo Bay, but is less sheltered from heatwaves than areas directly on or nearer the Pacific Ocean/Golden Gate such as San Francisco and Oakland. Although slightly less marine, average temperatures range between 8 °C (46 °F) in January and 19.8 °C (67.6 °F) in July. However, summer is very long with June–September being almost equal in historical average temperatures. This seasonal lag sees October averages being higher than in May in spite of it being after the equinox (meaning less daylight than darkness).

Climate data for Vallejo
| Month | Jan | Feb | Mar | Apr | May | Jun | Jul | Aug | Sep | Oct | Nov | Dec | Year |
|---|---|---|---|---|---|---|---|---|---|---|---|---|---|
| Record high °F (°C) | 84.9 (29.4) | 86.0 (30.0) | 91.9 (33.3) | 95.0 (35.0) | 104.0 (40.0) | 114.8 (46.0) | 111.9 (44.4) | 109.9 (43.3) | 109.9 (43.3) | 106.0 (41.1) | 90.0 (32.2) | 81.0 (27.2) | 114.8 (46.0) |
| Mean daily maximum °F (°C) | 57.0 (13.9) | 61.5 (16.4) | 65.1 (18.4) | 69.6 (20.9) | 74.5 (23.6) | 79.0 (26.1) | 79.9 (26.6) | 81.9 (27.7) | 82.0 (27.8) | 76.5 (24.7) | 65.8 (18.8) | 57.6 (14.2) | 70.9 (21.6) |
| Daily mean °F (°C) | 47.7 (8.7) | 51.1 (10.6) | 53.4 (11.9) | 56.7 (13.7) | 61.2 (16.2) | 65.7 (18.7) | 67.6 (19.8) | 67.5 (19.7) | 66.7 (19.3) | 62.1 (16.7) | 54.3 (12.4) | 48.2 (9.0) | 58.5 (14.7) |
| Mean daily minimum °F (°C) | 38.3 (3.5) | 40.8 (4.9) | 42.1 (5.6) | 43.7 (6.5) | 47.7 (8.7) | 51.3 (10.7) | 53.4 (11.9) | 53.1 (11.7) | 51.4 (10.8) | 47.8 (8.8) | 42.6 (5.9) | 38.8 (3.8) | 45.9 (7.7) |
| Record low °F (°C) | 19.0 (−7.2) | 23.0 (−5.0) | 23.0 (−5.0) | 27.0 (−2.8) | 30.0 (−1.1) | 34.0 (1.1) | 37.9 (3.3) | 32.0 (0.0) | 36.0 (2.2) | 28.0 (−2.2) | 26.6 (−3.0) | 14.0 (−10.0) | 14.0 (−10.0) |
| Average precipitation inches (mm) | 5.2 (131) | 4.4 (112) | 3.3 (84) | 1.7 (42) | 0.7 (18) | 0.2 (5) | 0 (0) | 0.1 (2) | 0.3 (8) | 1.4 (35) | 3.0 (76) | 4.6 (116) | 24.7 (627) |
| Average precipitation days | 11 | 10 | 9 | 6 | 3 | 1 | 0 | 0 | 1 | 4 | 8 | 10 | 63 |

== Demographics ==
Historical population
| Census | Pop. | Note | %± |
|---|---|---|---|
| 1870 | 2,188 | | — |
| 1880 | 5,987 | | 173.6% |
| 1890 | 6,343 | | 5.9% |
| 1900 | 7,965 | | 25.6% |
| 1910 | 11,340 | | 42.4% |
| 1920 | 21,107 | | 86.1% |
| 1930 | 16,072 | | −23.9% |
| 1940 | 20,072 | | 24.9% |
| 1950 | 26,038 | | 29.7% |
| 1960 | 60,877 | | 133.8% |
| 1970 | 71,710 | | 17.8% |
| 1980 | 80,303 | | 12.0% |
| 1990 | 109,199 | | 36.0% |
| 2000 | 116,760 | | 6.9% |
| 2010 | 115,942 | | −0.7% |
| 2020 | 126,090 | | 8.8% |
U.S. Decennial Census; 2010 2020

Vallejo was named the most diverse city in the United States in a 2012 study by Brown University based on 2010 census data, and the most diverse city in California by a Niche study based on 2017 American Community Survey data. In 2022, Vallejo was again named the most diverse small town in America, with a 77% chance any two residents would be of a different census racial category. Hispanics comprise 28% of the local population, 23% are White, 23% are Asian, 19% are Black, and 7% are of mixed or other heritages.

Vallejo city, California – Racial and Ethnic Composition
| Race / ethnicity (NH = Non-Hispanic) | Pop 2000 | Pop 2010 | Pop 2020 | % 2000 | % 2010 | % 2020 |
|---|---|---|---|---|---|---|
| White alone (NH) | 35,533 | 28,946 | 26,440 | 30.43% | 24.97% | 20.97% |
| Black or African American alone (NH) | 27,201 | 24,876 | 24,446 | 23.30% | 21.46% | 19.39% |
| Native American or Alaska Native alone (NH) | 547 | 453 | 431 | 0.47% | 0.39% | 0.34% |
| Asian alone (NH) | 27,829 | 28,386 | 29,152 | 23.83% | 24.48% | 23.12% |
| Pacific Islander alone (NH) | 1,188 | 1,159 | 1,255 | 1.02% | 1.00% | 1.00% |
| Some other race alone (NH) | 312 | 304 | 1,037 | 0.27% | 0.26% | 0.82% |
| Mixed race or multi-racial (NH) | 5,559 | 5,653 | 7,494 | 4.76% | 4.88% | 5.94% |
| Hispanic or Latino (any race) | 18,591 | 26,165 | 35,835 | 15.92% | 22.57% | 28.42% |
| Total | 116,760 | 115,942 | 126,090 | 100.00% | 100.00% | 100.00% |

=== 2020 ===
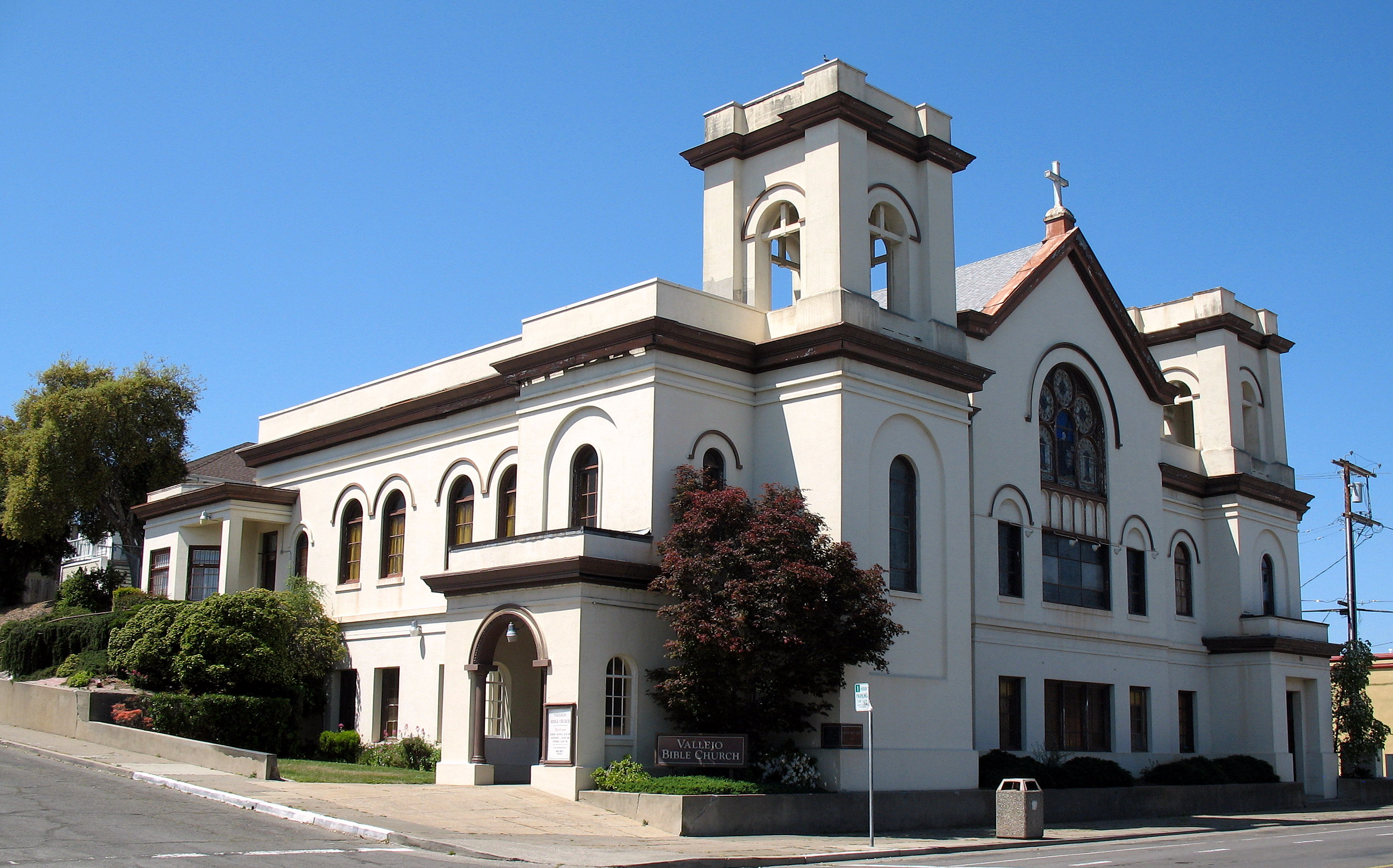
Vallejo Bible Church

The 2020 United States census reported that Vallejo had a population of 126,090. The population density was 4,145.0 inhabitants per square mile (1,600.4/km^{2}). The racial makeup of Vallejo was 24.2% White, 19.9% African American, 1.1% Native American, 23.6% Asian, 1.1% Pacific Islander, 17.5% from other races, and 12.6% from two or more races. Hispanic or Latino of any race were 28.4% of the population.

The census reported that 98.3% of the population lived in households, 1.3% lived in non-institutionalized group quarters, and 0.4% were institutionalized.

There were 43,539 households, out of which 32.2% included children under the age of 18, 42.4% were married-couple households, 7.8% were cohabiting couple households, 30.6% had a female householder with no partner present, and 19.2% had a male householder with no partner present. 23.9% of households were one person, and 10.2% were one person aged 65 or older. The average household size was 2.85. There were 29,987 families (68.9% of all households).

The age distribution was 20.5% under the age of 18, 8.8% aged 18 to 24, 27.1% aged 25 to 44, 26.3% aged 45 to 64, and 17.2% who were 65 years of age or older. The median age was 39.8 years. For every 100 females, there were 95.0 males.

There were 45,523 housing units at an average density of 1,496.5 units per square mile (577.8 units/km^{2}), of which 43,539 (95.6%) were occupied. Of these, 56.3% were owner-occupied, and 43.7% were occupied by renters.

In 2023, the US Census Bureau estimated that the median household income was $89,496, and the per capita income was $40,845. About 8.9% of families and 12.0% of the population were below the poverty line.

=== 2010 ===
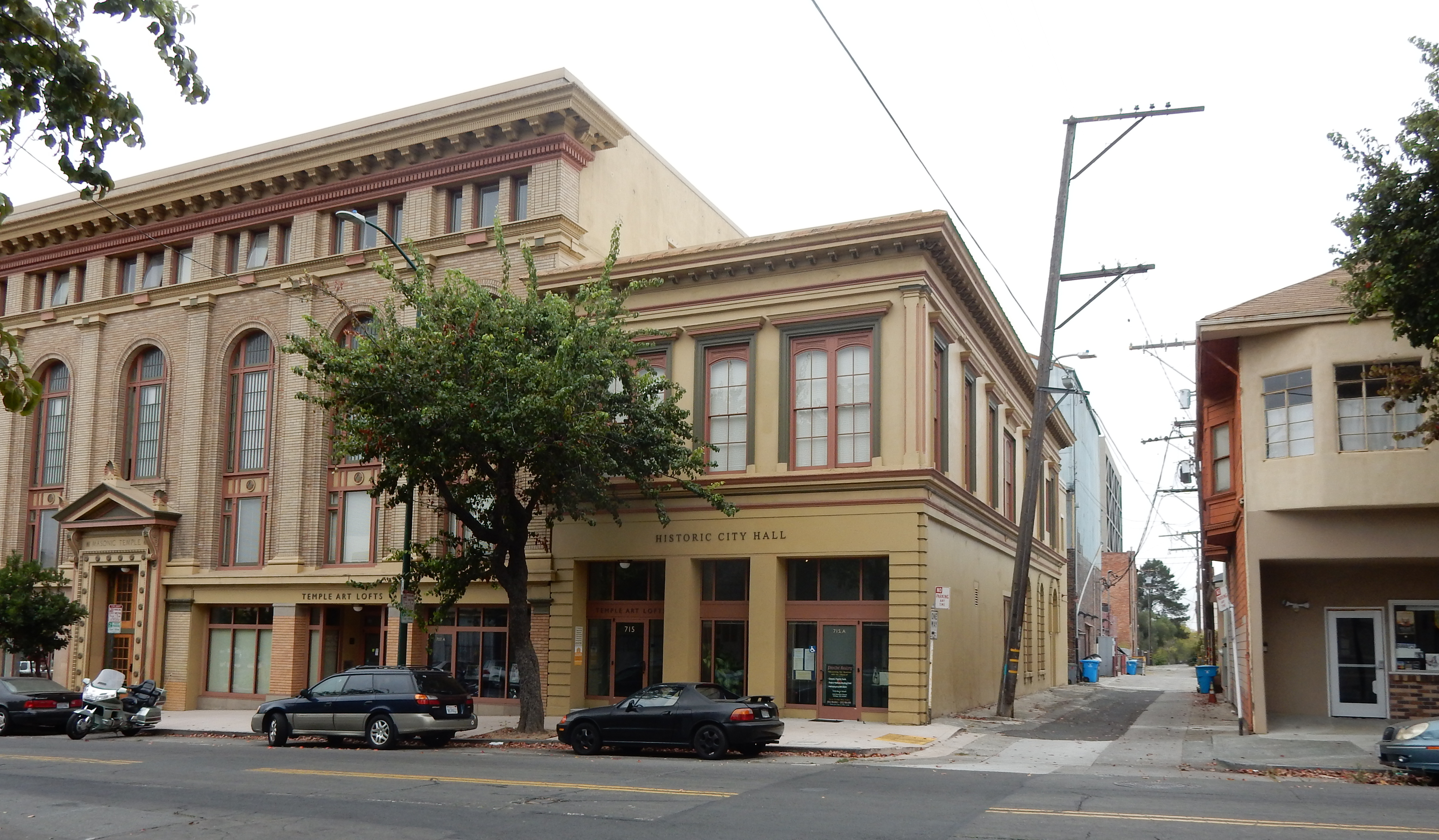
Downtown Vallejo

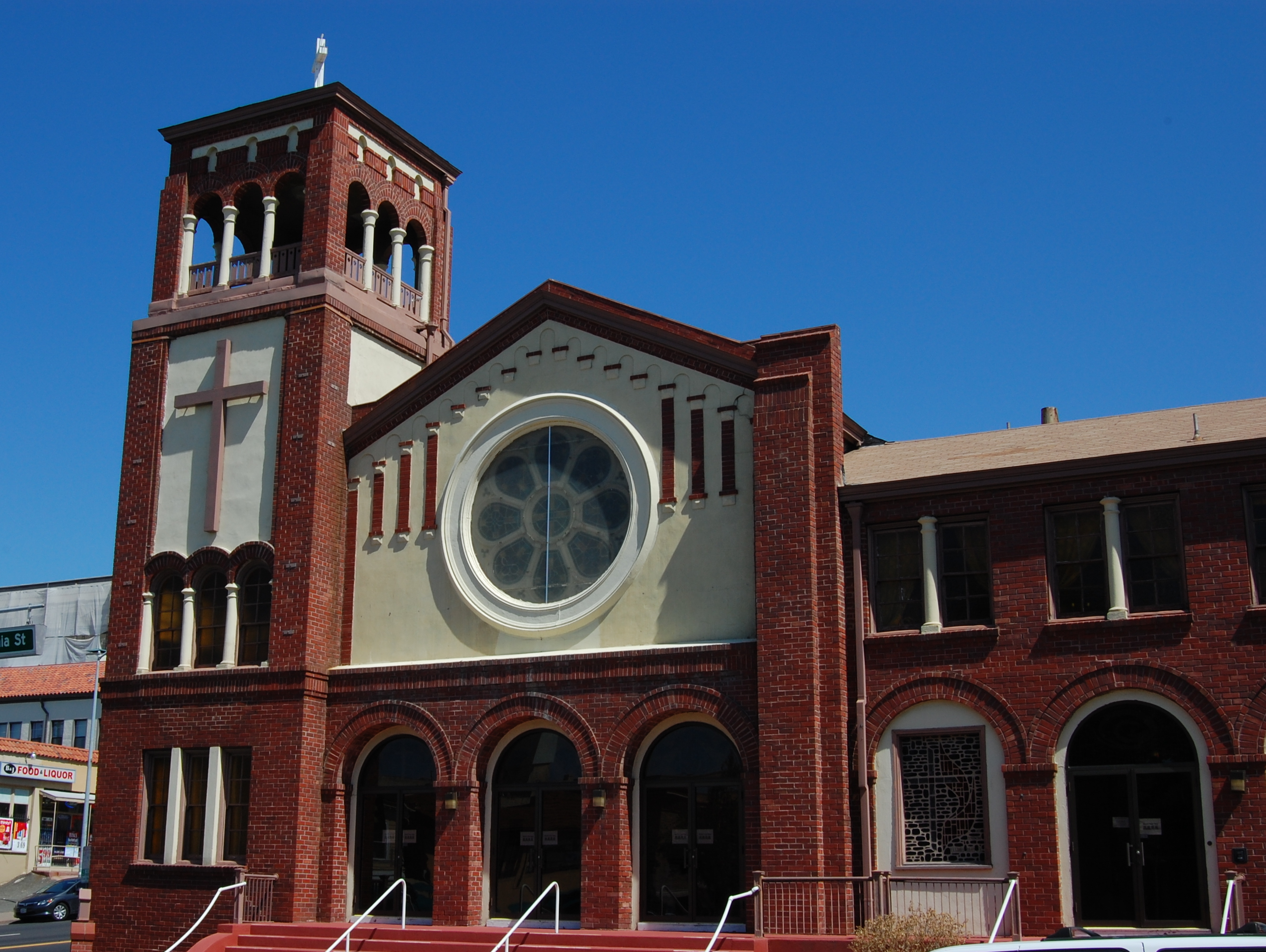
First United Methodist Church

The 2010 United States census reported that Vallejo had a population of 115,942. The population density was 2,340.3 inhabitants per square mile (903.6/km^{2}). The racial makeup of Vallejo was 38,066 (32.9%) White, 25,572 (22.1%) African American, 757 (0.7%) Native American, 28,895 (24.9%) Asian (21.1% Filipino, 1.0% Indian, 0.9% Chinese, 0.5% Vietnamese, 0.2% Japanese, 0.2% Korean, 0.1% Laotian), 1,239 (1.1%) Pacific Islander, 12,759 (11.0%) from other races, and 8,656 (7.5%) from two or more races. Hispanic or Latino of any race were 26,165 persons (22.6%). Non-Hispanic Whites numbered 28,946 persons (25.0%).

The Census reported that 114,279 people (98.6% of the population) lived in households, 1,130 (1.0%) lived in non-institutionalized group quarters, and 533 (0.5%) were institutionalized.

There were 40,559 households, out of which 14,398 (35.5%) had children under the age of 18 living in them, 17,819 (43.9%) were opposite-sex married couples living together, 7,214 (17.8%) had a female householder with no husband present, 2,755 (6.8%) had a male householder with no wife present. There were 2,804 (6.9%) unmarried opposite-sex partnerships, and 497 (1.2%) same-sex married couples or partnerships. 9,870 households (24.3%) were made up of individuals, and 3,255 (8.0%) had someone living alone who was 65 years of age or older. The average household size was 2.82. There were 27,788 families (68.5% of all households); the average family size was 3.36.

The population was spread out, with 26,911 people (23.2%) under the age of 18, 11, 69 people (10.1%) aged 18 to 24, 30,053 people (25.9%) aged 25 to 44, 33,312 people (28.7%) aged 45 to 64, and 13,999 people (12.1%) who were 65 years of age or older. The median age was 37.9 years. For every 100 females, there were 94.3 males. For every 100 females age 18 and over, there were 91.4 males.

There were 44,433 housing units at an average density of 896.9 units per square mile (346.3 units/km^{2}), of which 24,188 (59.6%) were owner-occupied, and 16,371 (40.4%) were occupied by renters. The homeowner vacancy rate was 3.0%; the rental vacancy rate was 9.4%. 68,236 people (58.9% of the population) lived in owner-occupied housing units and 46,043 people (39.7%) lived in rental housing units.

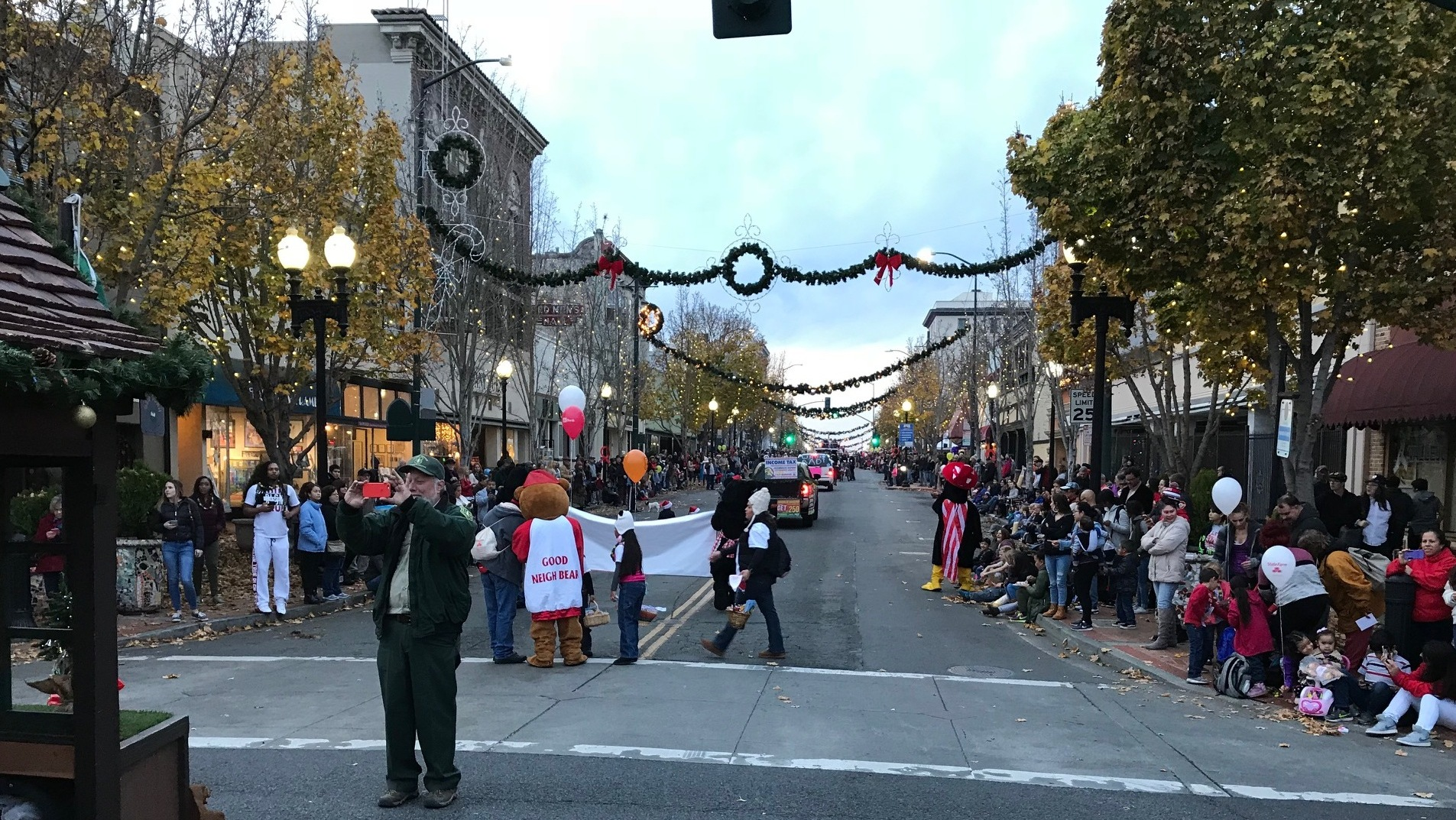
Vallejo's Mad Hatter Holiday Parade

| Demographic profile | 2010 | 1990 | 1970 | 1950 |
|---|---|---|---|---|
| White | 32.8% | 50.5% | 78.2% | 90.8% |
| —Non-Hispanic | 25.0% | 46.2% | N/A | N/A |
| Black or African American | 22.1% | 21.2% | 16.6% | 5.8% |
| Hispanic or Latino (of any race) | 22.6% | 10.8% | 6.1% | N/A |
| Asian | 24.9% | 23.0% | 4.1% | 0.6% |

== Economy ==
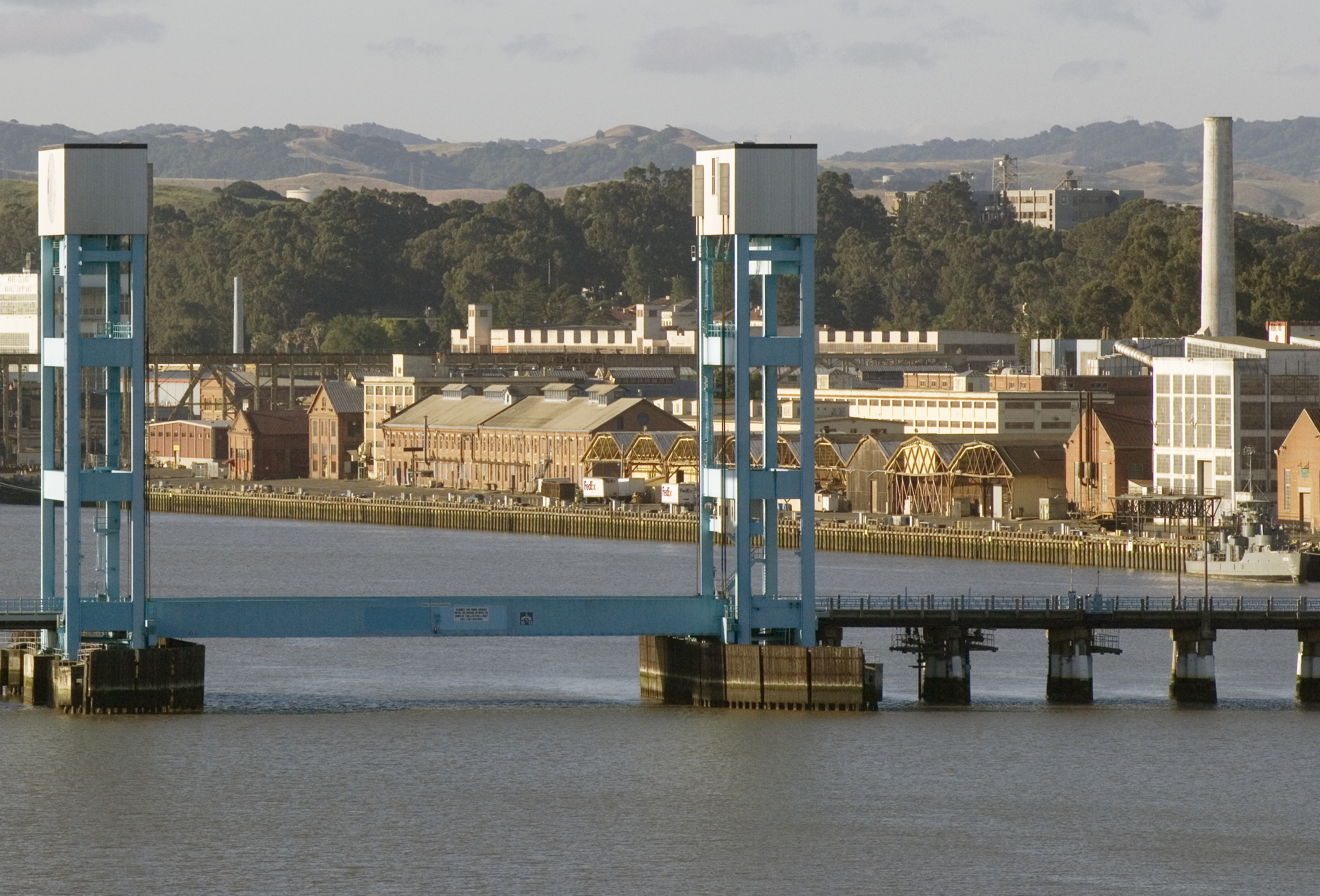
Since the closure of the Mare Island Naval Shipyard in 1996, the federal, state, and city governments have funded the continuing redevelopment of Mare Island into a mixed-use district.

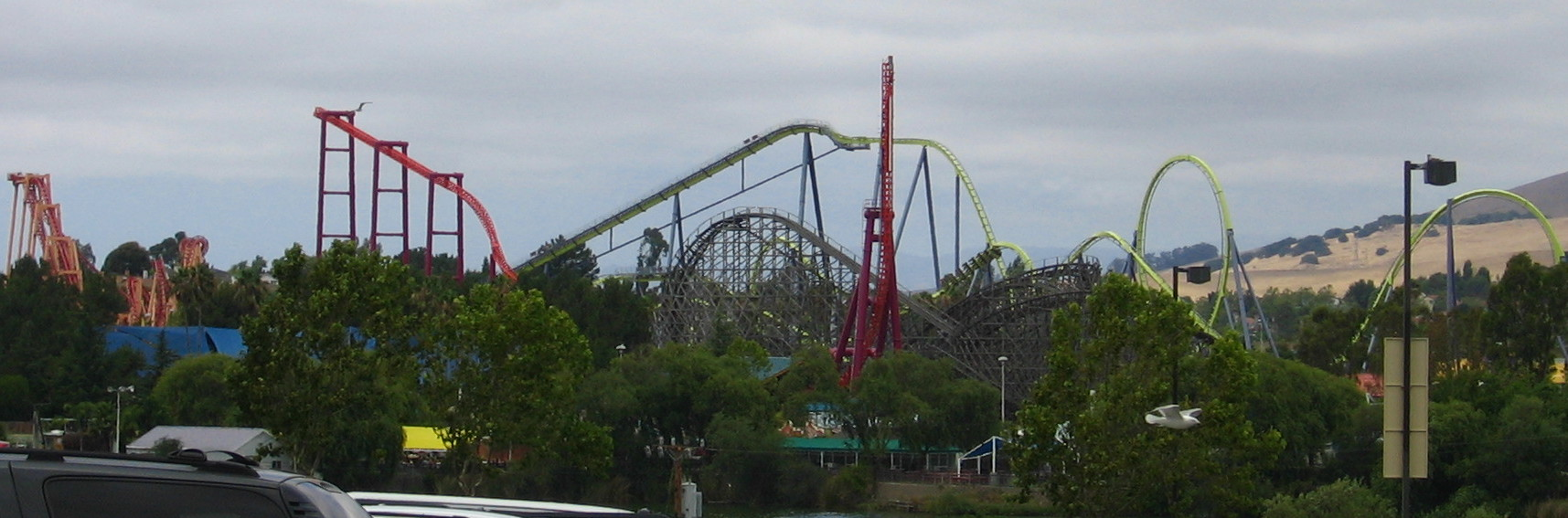
Six Flags Discovery Kingdom

As the second largest city in the North Bay region of the Bay Area, Vallejo is a regional economic hub for the North Bay and specifically Solano County.

Top employers

According to the city's 2024 Annual Comprehensive Financial Report, the top employers in the city are:

| # | Employer | # of Employees |
|---|---|---|
| 1 | Kaiser Permanente Medical Center | 2,735 |
| 2 | Vallejo City Unified School District | 2,160 |
| 3 | Six Flags Discovery Kingdom | 1,660 |
| 4 | Kaiser Permanente Advice & Call Center | 830 |
| 5 | Sutter Solano Medical Center | 600 |
| 6 | City of Vallejo | 598 |
| 7 | U.S. Forest Service | 400 |
| 8 | California Highway Patrol | 300 |
| 9 | U.S. Postal Service | 215 |
| 10 | California Maritime Academy | 208 |

== Arts and culture ==
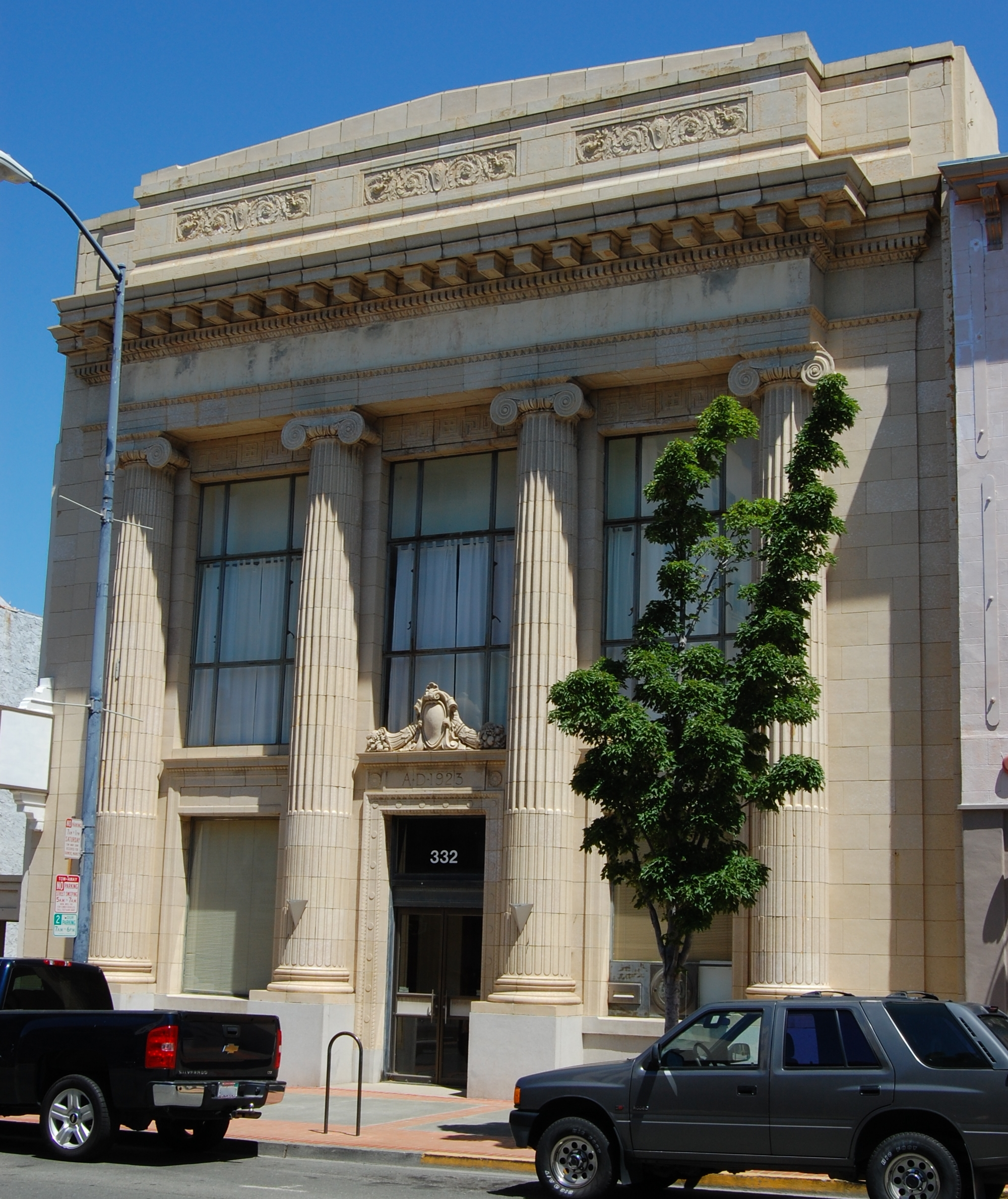
Bank of Italy building

In recent years, Vallejo has attracted a large community of artists to the region in search of lower rent and larger work-spaces. Artists pushed out of larger Bay Area cities like San Francisco and Oakland have been working with city leaders to revitalize the once blighted downtown area.

The artist-run Vallejo Art Walk scheduled on the second Friday of every month in downtown Vallejo has been recognized as a hub for artists in the Bay Area and the entirety of California.

=== LGBTQ community ===
As early as the 1940s and before, Vallejo is known to have had a well-formed gay community, which was a short drive or boat ride away from San Francisco. At one time, Vallejo boasted eight gay bars. After a migration of gays and lesbians from San Francisco in the decade 2000–2009, openly gay members of the community encountered what they described as a backlash against them. The school district was threatened by the ACLU with a lawsuit for harassment on behalf of a 17-year-old lesbian by school administrators. The school settled the lawsuit with the student. The school agreed to pay her $25,000, adopt a more stringent non-discrimination policy, and include a curriculum that positively portrayed gay and lesbian people.

== Government ==
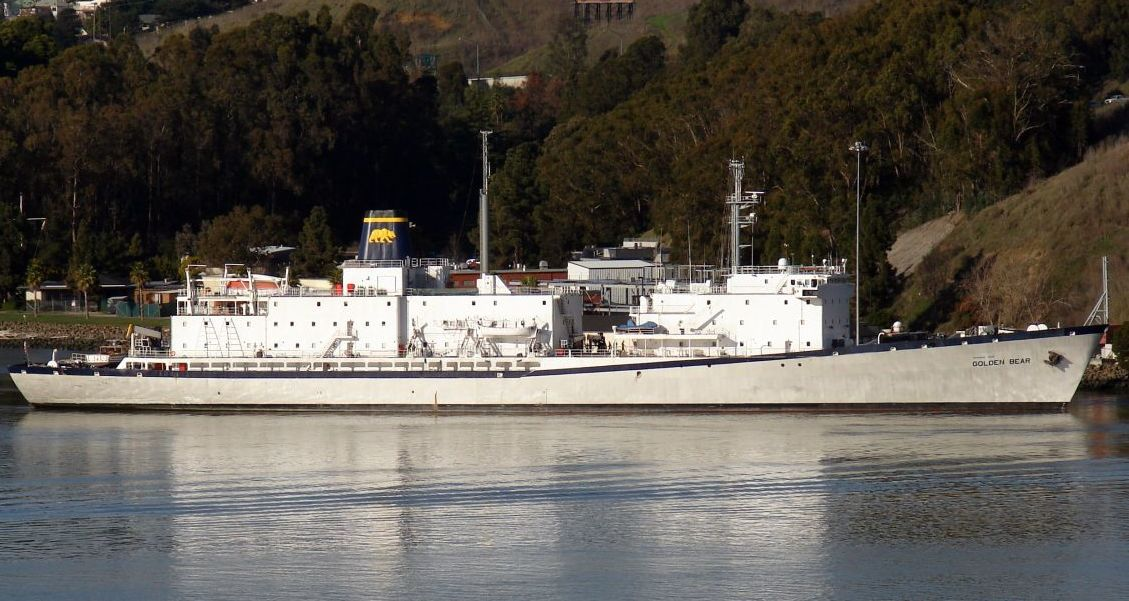
The Golden Bear, the training ship of Cal Poly Maritime Academy

The Government of Vallejo is defined under the Charter of the City of Vallejo. It is a council–manager government and consists of the Mayor, City Council, and numerous departments and officers under the supervision of the City Manager, such as the Vallejo Police Department, Vallejo Fire Department, Vallejo Public Works Department, and Vallejo Economic Development Department. As of October 2025, the council consists of Andrea Sorce (Mayor), Peter Bregenzer (Vice Mayor), Alexander Matias, Diosdado "JR" Matulac, Tonia Lediju, Charles Palmares, and Helen-Marie Gordon.

Residents of Vallejo participate in elections for Solano County Board of Supervisors Districts 1 and 2. As of November 2022, these seats were represented by Supervisors Cassandra James and Monica Brown, respectively.

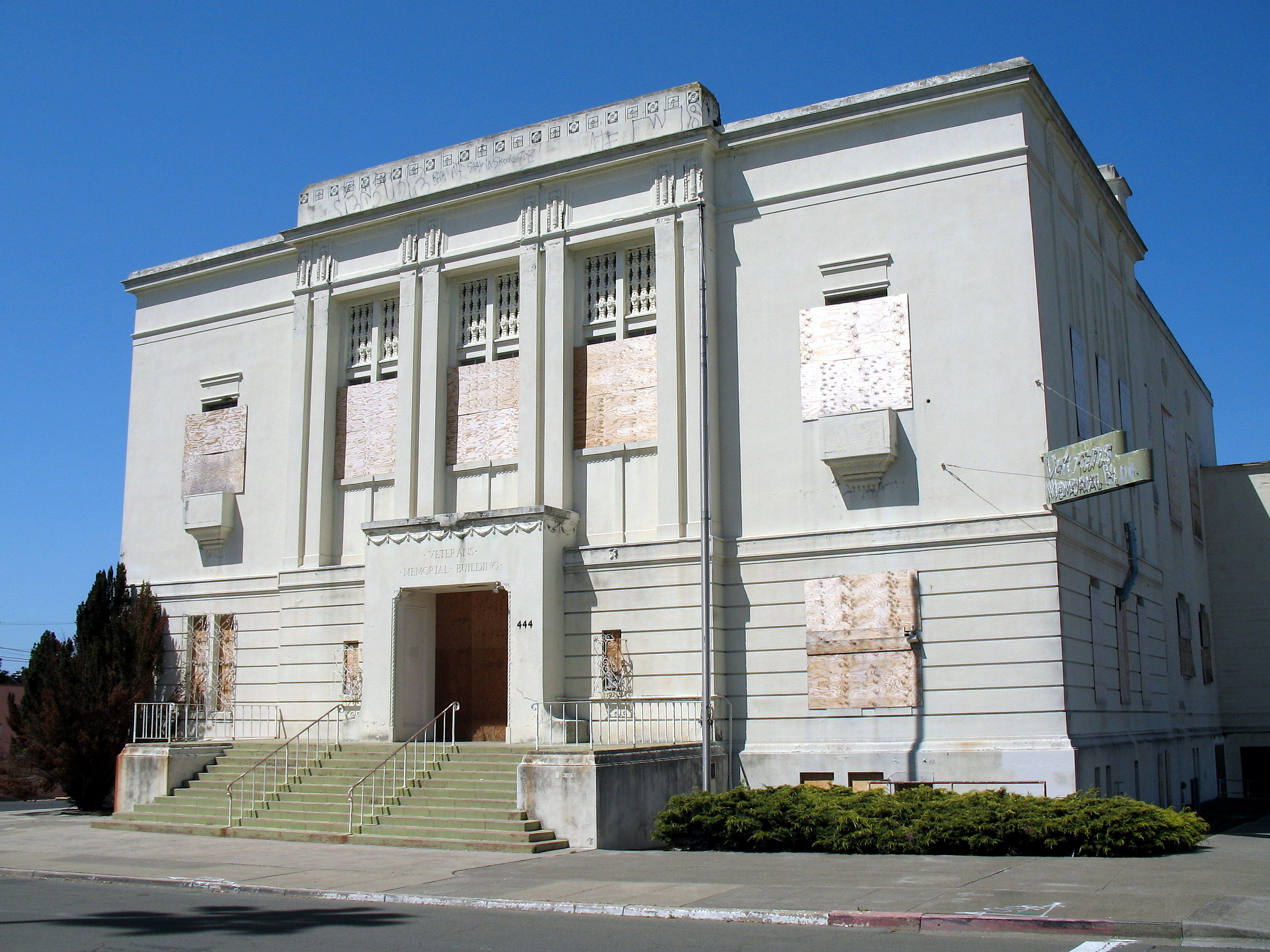
The Veterans Memorial Building

In the California State Legislature, Vallejo is in the 3rd senatorial district, represented by Democrat Christopher Cabaldon, and in the 11th Assembly district, represented by Democrat Lori Wilson. In the United States House of Representatives, it's in California's 8th congressional district, represented by Democrat John Garamendi.

In 2008, the government of Vallejo filed for bankruptcy. A judge declared the bankruptcy over in 2011, but analysts have noted that the city did little to resolve its largest expense—public pensions—and may face a second round of bankruptcy.

As of September 2022, there were 69,546 registered voters in Vallejo; of these, 40,818 (58.7%) are Democrats, 8,751 (12.6%) are Republicans, and 15,612 (22.4%) stated no party preference.

=== Participatory budgeting ===
On April 17, 2012, the City Council approved the first no citywide participatory budgeting (PB) process in the United States. The Council allocated $3.4 million to the Vallejo PB process and since then, Vallejo residents and business and property owners have been developing and designing project ideas. They have vetted and reduced more than 800 project ideas to 36 projects that will be on the ballot. Vallejo residents 14 years of age and older will vote and choose six out of 36 projects to vote on from May 11 through May 18, 2013.

The second cycle of participatory budgeting in Vallejo was initiated on February 4, 2014, with $2.4 million allocated. A public vote open to all residents of Vallejo age 16 and over took place in October 2014.

=== Police ===
Vallejo has had one of California's highest rates of police killings in recent years. A 2023 Vallejo Sun story described Vallejo's police department as "one of California's most deadly." In 2020, the department engaged a consulting firm to assess how to address extensive killings by its officers. The firm issued 45 recommendations, which were endorsed by the California attorney general; but according to reporting from the Vallejo Free Press and ProPublica, only two of the recommendations had been fully implemented by 2022.

Vallejo has seen a rate of killings by police officers that is significantly higher than the national average and other Bay Area cities. These incidents included the fatal shooting of Willie McCoy by six officers in 2019 and the shooting of Sean Monterrosa, who was unarmed, during protests following the murder of George Floyd in 2020. One of the officers who killed McCoy had previously killed an unarmed man as he fled, while another killed three men over a five-month period and was later promoted. Vallejo Police killed 19 people between 2010 and 2020. In 2012, police shootings accounted for six of the 20 homicides to occur in the city, and the frequency of officer-involved shootings stood at around 38 times the national rate.

== Education ==
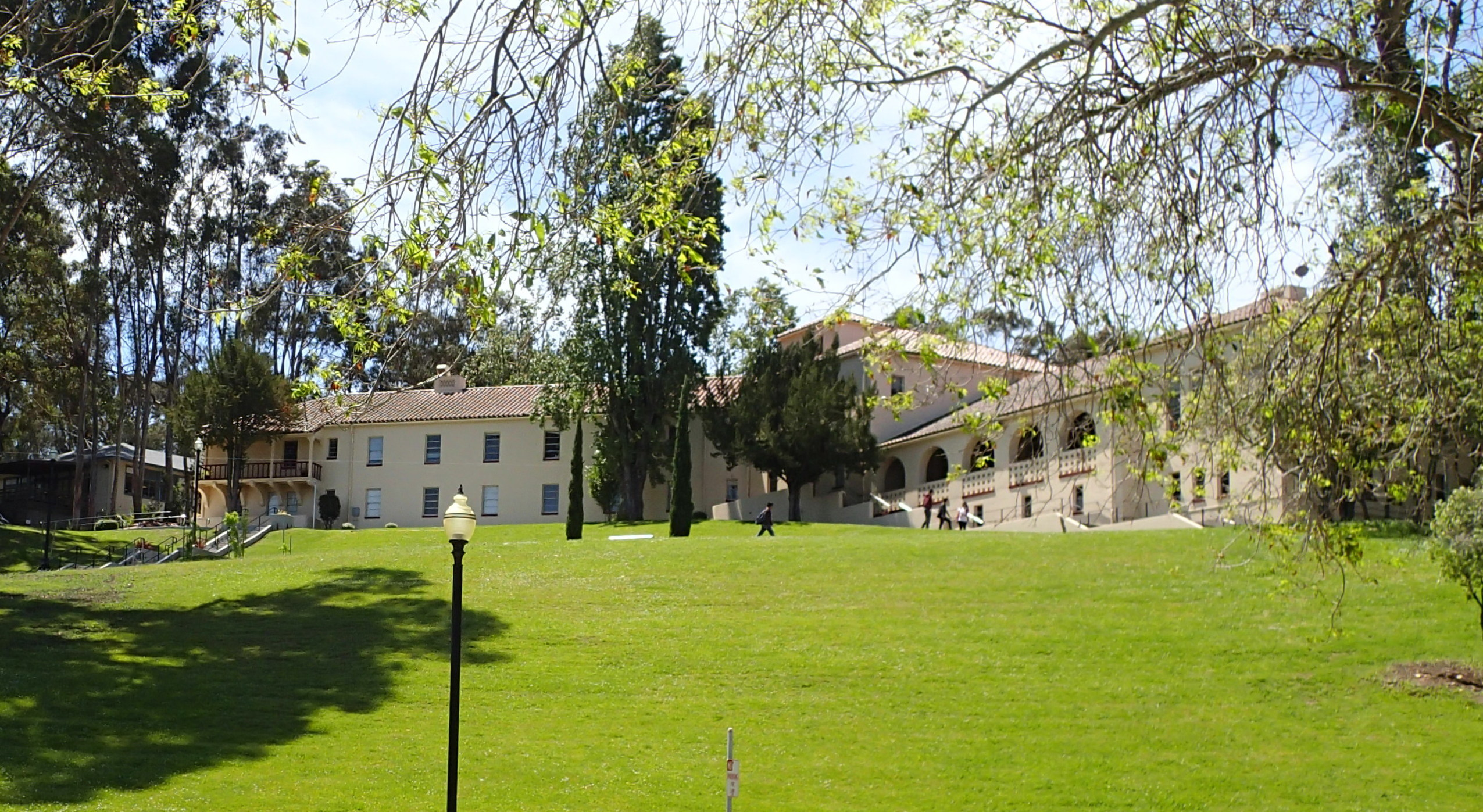
Touro University California

Public schools in Vallejo are provided by Vallejo City Unified School District. The city is also served by private and charter schools, a community college district, and two colleges.

=== Public schools ===
As of the 2025–26 school year, Vallejo City Unified School District comprises ten elementary schools, four middle schools (including Vallejo Charter School), two comprehensive high schools (Vallejo High School and Jesse M. Bethel High School), three alternative school programs, and an adult school.

==== Independent charter schools ====
- Caliber ChangeMakers Academy (middle school)
- ELITE Public Schools
- Griffin Academy Middle and High School
- Mare Island Technology Academy Middle School
- Mare Island Technology High School

=== Private schools ===
Private institutions with campuses in Vallejo include:

- Jia Christian Academy
- Mustard Seed Preschool and Kindergarten
- North Hills Christian School
- St. Basil Catholic School
- St. Catherine of Siena School
- St. Patrick-St. Vincent High School
- Starting Gate School

=== Universities and colleges ===
Vallejo is within the Solano Community College district, which opened a new Vallejo campus in 2018.

Touro University California, a private university, and Cal Poly Maritime Academy, a branch campus of the public California Polytechnic State University, San Luis Obispo, are in Vallejo.

=== Closed schools ===
Schools that once served the Vallejo community include:

- Beverly Hills Elementary School
- Carquinez Elementary School
- Charles F. Curry Elementary School (opened 1921, closed in 1981, demolished 2007)
- McKinley Elementary School
- Grant Elementary School
- Roosevelt Elementary School
- Benjamin Franklin Middle School (closed 2020)
- Solano Junior High School
- Springstowne Junior High
- Hogan High School
- James Marshall Hendricks High School
- People's Alternative School

== Transportation ==
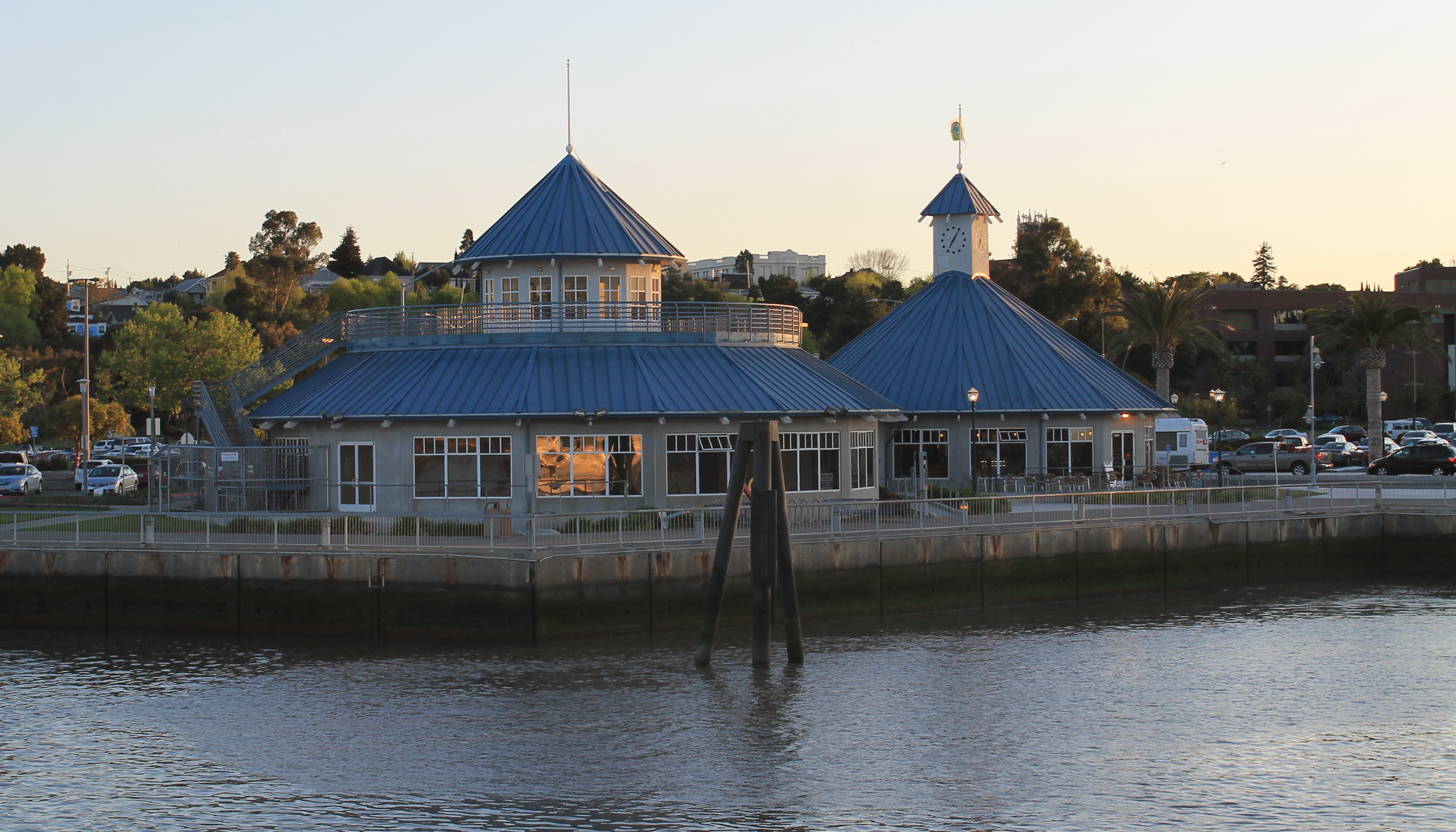
Vallejo Ferry Terminal, served by the San Francisco Bay Ferry

Vallejo's public transit includes the San Francisco Bay Ferry, which regularly runs from downtown Vallejo to the San Francisco Ferry Building, as well as Amtrak Thruway. SolTrans buses carry passengers around the cities of Vallejo and Benicia, and offers express service to Fairfield, California, and Bay Area Rapid Transit stations in El Cerrito, California and Walnut Creek, California. The Vallejo Transit Center, located next to Vallejo Station is a hub for several bus lines at 311 Sacramento Street.

The Amtrak Thruway 7 bus makes two stops in Vallejo daily; one at Vallejo Station, and one at Six Flags Discovery Kingdom. From there, connections are available to Martinez to the south, and Arcata to the north.

Vallejo is accessible by Interstate 80 between San Francisco and Sacramento, and is the location for the northern half of the Carquinez Bridge. It is also accessible by Interstate 780 from neighboring Benicia to the east, and by Route 37 from Marin County to the west. Route 29 (former U.S. Route 40) begins in the city near the Carquinez Bridge and travels north through the heart of the city and beyond into Napa County. U.S. Bicycle Route 50 also travels through the city, mainly through Georgia Street, Columbus Parkway and the Solano Bikeway.

== Media ==
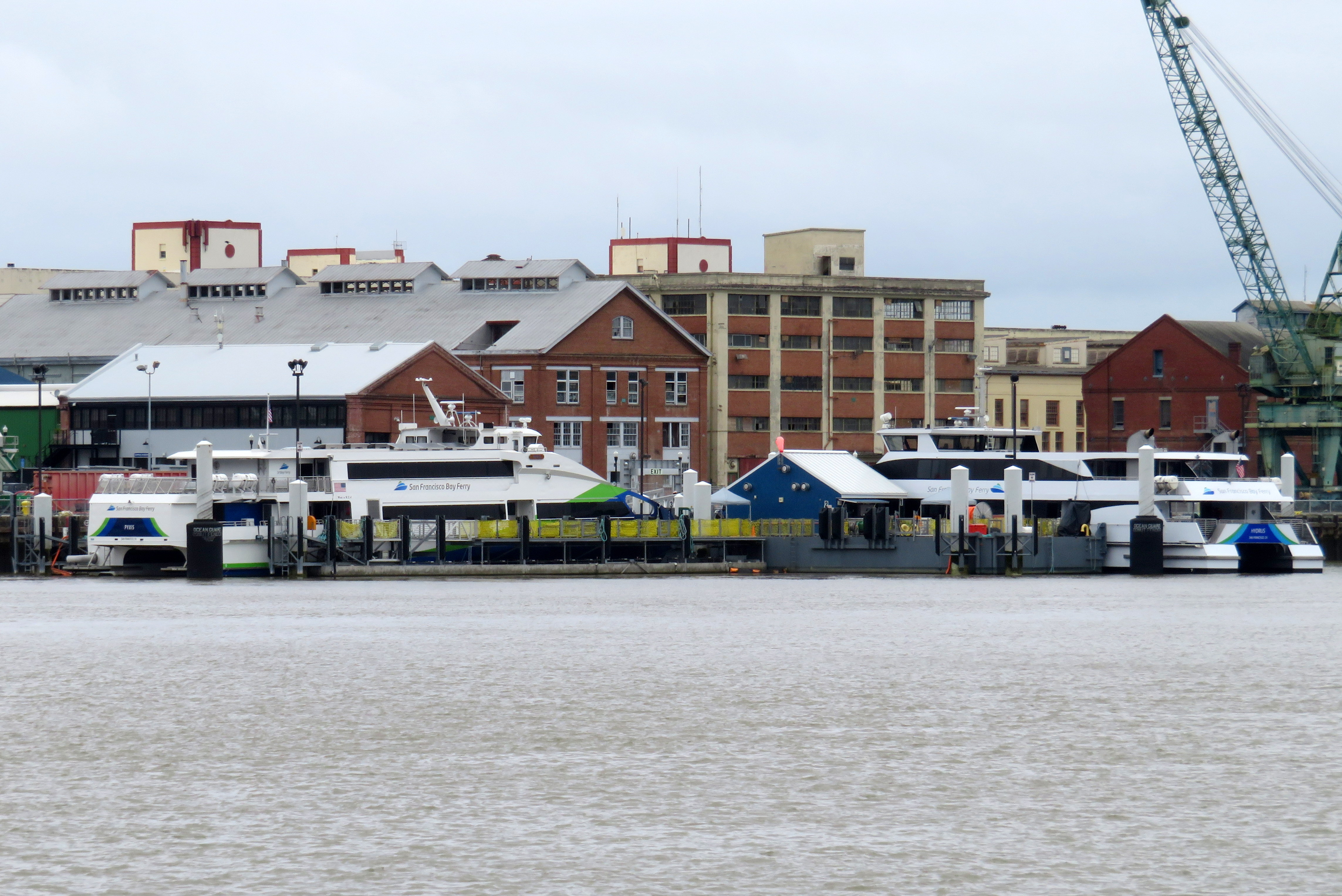
Mare Island ferry terminal, served by the San Francisco Bay Ferry

The principal local newspaper is the Vallejo Times Herald. The community is also served by the Vallejo Independent Bulletin and by Vallejo Community Access Television (VCAT 27).

Open Vallejo is an independent, nonprofit public interest newsroom primarily focused on investigative and explanatory reporting.

The Vallejo Sun is an independent, for-profit newsletter and website that serves Vallejo and Solano County with city, police, housing, education and events coverage.

Local radio broadcast stations include KZCT 89.5 FM community radio station and KDIA/KDYA Christian radio stations

== Sister cities ==
Vallejo has six sister cities:

| City | Country | Year of Partnership |
|---|---|---|
| Trondheim | Norway | 1960 |
| Akashi | Japan | 1968 |
| La Spezia | Italy | 1987 |
| Baguio | Philippines | 1993 |
| Bagamoyo | Tanzania | 1993 |
| Jincheon | South Korea | 2001 |

== See also ==
- List of cities and towns in California
- List of cities and towns in the San Francisco Bay Area
- USS Vallejo, 3 ships
