= 1981 San Diego Chargers season =

1981 NFL team season

- Owner: Gene Klein
- General manager: Johnny Sanders
- Head coach: Don Coryell
- Offensive coordinator: Larrye Weaver
- Defensive coordinator: Jack Pardee
- Home stadium: Jack Murphy Stadium

Results
- Record: 10–6
- Division place: 1st AFC West
- Playoffs: Won Divisional Playoffs (at Dolphins) 41–38 (OT); Lost AFC Championship (at Bengals) 7–27
- All-Pros: 3: DT Gary Johnson (1st team); DT Louie Kelcher (2nd team); TE Kellen Winslow (1st team)
- Pro Bowlers: 5: QB Dan Fouts; DT Gary Johnson; RB Chuck Muncie; G Doug Wilkerson; TE Kellen Winslow

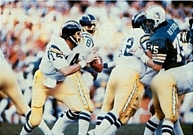
Chargers' quarterback back Dan Fouts (middle) runs a play against the Dolphins in the AFC Divisional Playoff game "Epic in Miami".

The 1981 San Diego Chargers season was the franchise's 12th season in the National Football League (NFL) and its 22nd overall. The team failed to improve on their 11–5 record from 1980 but they did retain the AFC West Division title for the third consecutive year, finishing 10–6. In the playoffs, they beat the Dolphins in a classic game known as the Epic in Miami then lost to the Bengals in a frigid game known as the Freezer Bowl.

1981 was the second straight season in which the Chargers reached the AFC Championship Game, as well as their second consecutive loss. (Note: The Chargers had lost to the Raiders in the playoffs in the previous season.)

During this season, the Chargers lost two key players by way of trade. Before week 3, wide receiver John Jefferson was dealt to the Green Bay Packers while defensive end Fred Dean would be dealt to the eventual Super Bowl champion San Francisco 49ers by Week 5. The Chargers brought in Wes Chandler from New Orleans to replace Jefferson. After a slow start, he finished with 857 yards from 12 games (he had 1,142 yards on the season, counting his four games with the Saints). The other starting wideout was Charlie Joiner who had one of his best seasons at age 34, gaining a career-high 1,188 yards and matching his career-best with 7 touchdowns. Rounding out the trio of receiving stars, tight end Kellen Winslow led the league in receptions for the second consecutive year, finishing with 88 catches for 1,075 yards and 10 touchdowns.

Quarterback Dan Fouts broke the NFL record for passing yardage for the third consecutive season, averaging 300 yards per game for the first time as he totaled 4,802. His touchdown-to-interception ratio was the best of his career at 33 to 17. He was helped in this by a strong offensive line, anchored by veterans Russ Washington and Doug Wilkerson who conceded only 19 sacks from 16 games, their best performance through Fouts' 15 years with the club. Running back Chuck Muncie enjoyed his best season, running for 1,144 yards and 19 touchdowns, tying the then-NFL season record for rushing touchdowns. With rookie James Brooks and John Cappelletti also contributing, San Diego rushed for over 2,000 yards for the only time during the pass-focussed Don Coryell's tenure.

While the offense was soaring to new heights, the defense collapsed in Dean's absence, becoming among the league's worst. They continued to be tough against the run but with veteran safety Glen Edwards absent with injury through the first half of the season, they dropped to dead last against the pass: the 4,311 yards they conceded were a new NFL record. On the plus side, they did manage an above-average 23 interceptions with Willie Buchanon snagging a team-leading five. San Diego's sack count declined somewhat from 60 to 47, tied for third-best in the NFL. New starter John Woodcock tied with Gary Johnson as team-leaders, each managing 9.5 sacks.

On special teams, James Brooks put in a strong performance: his 13.2 yards per punt return was second best in the league with 23.7 yards per kickoff return, he ranked seventh. Rolf Benirschke made 19 of 26 field goals, including two late game-winners.

The season was chronicled on September 18, 2008 for America's Game: The Missing Rings as the greatest NFL team to never win the Super Bowl.

== 1981 NFL draft ==
1981 San Diego Chargers draft
Round	Pick	Player	Position	College	Notes
1	24	James Brooks *	RB	Auburn	
3	77	Irvin Phillips	CB	Arkansas Tech	
4	103	Amos Lawrence	RB	North Carolina	
4	107	Eric Sievers	TE	Maryland	
5	131	Keith Ferguson	LB	Ohio State	
6	141	Andrew Gissinger	OT	Syracuse	
6	162	Bobby Duckworth	WR	Arkansas	
7	189	Pete Holohan	TE	Notre Dame	
10	268	Robert Parham	RB	Grambling	
11	280	Matt Petrzelka	T	Iowa	
11	300	Carlos Bradley	LB	Wake Forest	
12	327	Stacy Charles	WR	Bethune-Cookman	
Made roster † Pro Football Hall of Fame * Made at least one Pro Bowl during career

== Personnel ==
=== Staff ===
1981 San Diego Chargers staff
Front office: Owner – Eugene V. Klein; Head coaches: Head Coach – Don Coryell; Offensive coaches: Offensive Coordinator – Larrye Weaver	Defensive coaches: Defensive Coordinator – Jack Pardee

=== Roster ===
1981 San Diego Chargers roster
Quarterbacks (QB): 14 Dan Fouts; 12 James Harris; 11 Ed Luther; Running backs (RB): 37 Hank Bauer; 21 James Brooks; 25 John Cappelletti; 46 Chuck Muncie; 40 Clarence Williams; Wide receivers (WR): 89 Wes Chandler; 81 Scott Fitzkee; 18 Charlie Joiner; 87 Dwight Scales; Tight ends (TE): 85 Eric Sievers; 80 Kellen Winslow	Offensive linemen (OL): 77 Sam Claphan T; 64 Chuck Loewen T/G; 62 Don Macek C; 56 Bob Rush C; 66 Billy Shields T; 70 Russ Washington T; 67 Ed White G; 63 Doug Wilkerson G; Defensive linemen (DL): 76 Keith Ferguson DE; 79 Gary Johnson DT; 68 Leroy Jones DE; 74 Louie Kelcher DT; 61 Jimmy Webb DT; 90 John Woodcock DE; 99 Wilbur Young DE/DT	Linebackers (LB): 50 Carlos Bradley OLB; 55 Bob Horn MLB; 57 Linden King OLB; 54 Jim Laslavic MLB; 51 Woodrow Lowe OLB; 52 Ray Preston OLB; Defensive backs (DB): 28 Willie Buchanon CB; 27 Glen Edwards FS; 48 Allan Ellis CB; 43 Bob Gregor FS; 32 Wyatt Henderson CB; 23 Irvin Phillips CB; 44 Pete Shaw SS; 29 Mike Williams CB; Special teams (ST): 6 Rolf Benirschke K; 4 George Roberts P	Reserve: 91 Rick Ackerman DT (IR); 45 Doug Beaudoin S (IR); 73 Charles DeJurnett DT (IR); 8 Bobby Duckworth WR (IR); 47 Frank Duncan S (IR); 75 Andrew Gissinger T (IR); 65 Brad Hendrix G (IR); 88 Pete Holohan TE (Left squad); 53 Ralph Perretta C/G (Ret.); 60 Don Reese DE (IR); 59 Cliff Thrift LB (IR); 35 Steve Whitman RB (IR); 72 Jeff Williams G (IR); Rookies in italics

== Preseason ==
1981 preseason games
Week	Date	Opponent	Result	Record	Venue	Attendance
1	August 8	St. Louis Cardinals	L 10–12	0–1	Jack Murphy Stadium	
2	August 15	at San Francisco 49ers	W 31–28	1–1	Candlestick Park	
3	August 21	Los Angeles Rams	W 33–29	2–1	Jack Murphy Stadium	
4	August 28	Buffalo Bills	L 24–30	2–2	Jack Murphy Stadium	

== Regular season ==
=== Schedule ===
Week	Date	Opponent	Result	Record	Venue	Attendance	Recap
1	September 7	at Cleveland Browns	**W** 44–14	1–0	Cleveland Municipal Stadium	78,904	Recap
2	September 13	Detroit Lions	**W** 28–23	2–0	Jack Murphy Stadium	51,264	Recap
3	September 20	at **Kansas City Chiefs**	**W** 42–31	3–0	Arrowhead Stadium	63,866	Recap
4	September 27	at **Denver Broncos**	**L** 24–42	3–1	Mile High Stadium	74,822	Recap
5	October 4	**Seattle Seahawks**	**W** 24–10	4–1	Jack Murphy Stadium	51,463	Recap
6	October 11	Minnesota Vikings	**L** 31–33	4–2	Jack Murphy Stadium	50,708	Recap
7	October 18	at Baltimore Colts	**W** 43–14	5–2	Memorial Stadium	41,921	Recap
8	October 25	at Chicago Bears	**L** 17–20 (OT)	5–3	Soldier Field	52,906	Recap
9	November 1	**Kansas City Chiefs**	**W** 22–20	6–3	Jack Murphy Stadium	51,307	Recap
10	November 8	Cincinnati Bengals	**L** 17–40	6–4	Jack Murphy Stadium	51,259	Recap
11	November 16	at **Seattle Seahawks**	**L** 23–44	6–5	Kingdome	58,628	Recap
12	November 22	at **Oakland Raiders**	**W** 55–21	7–5	Oakland–Alameda County Coliseum	50,199	Recap
13	November 29	**Denver Broncos**	**W** 34–17	8–5	Jack Murphy Stadium	51,533	Recap
14	December 6	Buffalo Bills	**L** 27–28	8–6	Jack Murphy Stadium	51,488	Recap
15	December 13	at Tampa Bay Buccaneers	**W** 24–23	9–6	Tampa Stadium	67,388	Recap
16	December 21	**Oakland Raiders**	**W** 23–10	10–6	Jack Murphy Stadium	52,279	Recap
Note: Intra-division opponents are in **bold** text.

=== Game summaries ===
==== Week 1: at Cleveland Browns ====
Week One: San Diego Chargers at Cleveland Browns – Game summary

Quarter	1	2	3	4	Total
**Chargers**	10	10	14	10	**44**
Browns	0	7	7	0	**14**

at Cleveland Municipal Stadium, Cleveland, Ohio

- Date: September 7
- Game time: 9:00 p.m. EDT
- Game weather: 66 °F (18.9 °C), relative humidity 80%, wind 6 miles per hour (9.7 km/h; 5.2 kn)
- Game attendance: 78,904
- Referee: Pat Haggerty
- TV announcers (ABC): Frank Gifford, Howard Cosell, and Don Meredith
- Box score

Game information

**First quarter**

- SDG – James Brooks 4-yard run (Rolf Benirschke kick), 10:50. Chargers 7–0. **Drive: 7 plays, 52 yards, 2:07.**
- SDG – Rolf Benirschke 50-yard field goal, 0:08. Chargers 10–0. **Drive: 9 plays, 51 yards, 5:12.**

**Second quarter**

- CLE – Ricky Feacher 18-yard pass from Brian Sipe (Dave Jacobs kick), 12:34. Chargers 10–7. **Drive: 5 plays, 72 yards, 2:34.**
- SDG – Chuck Muncie 9-yard run (Rolf Benirschke kick), 9:36. Chargers 17–7. **Drive: 5 plays, 66 yards, 2:58.**
- SDG – Rolf Benirschke 43-yard field goal, 3:45. Chargers 20–7. **Drive: 7 plays, 54 yards, 3:30.**

**Third quarter**

- SDG – James Brooks 13-yard pass from Dan Fouts (Rolf Benirschke kick), 11:51. Chargers 27–7. **Drive: 7 plays, 80 yards, 3:09.**
- CLE – Greg Pruitt 4-yard pass from Brian Sipe (Dave Jacobs kick), 7:47. Chargers 27–14. **Drive: 11 plays, 80 yards, 4:04.**
- SDG – Hank Bauer 4-yard pass from Dan Fouts (Rolf Benirschke kick), 5:32. Chargers 34–14. **Drive: 6 plays, 80 yards, 2:25.**

**Fourth quarter**

- SDG – Rolf Benirschke 32-yard field goal, 13:18. Chargers 37–14. **Drive: 6 plays, 79 yards, 2:14.**
- SDG – Ron Smith 38-yard pass from Dan Fouts (Rolf Benirschke kick), 4:20. Chargers 44–14. **Drive: 10 plays, 72 yards, 5:21.**

**Top passers**

- SDG – Dan Fouts – 19/25, 330 yards, 3 TD
- CLE – Brian Sipe – 31/57, 375 yards, 2 TD, 2 INT

**Top rushers**

- SDG – Chuck Muncie – 24 rushes, 161 yards, TD
- CLE – Mike Pruitt – 8 rushes, 30 yards

**Top receivers**

- SDG – Charlie Joiner – 6 receptions, 191 yards
- CLE – Ozzie Newsome – 6 receptions, 87 yards

James Brooks ran a punt back 21 yards to start the first Chargers possession and finished it with a 4-yard touchdown run. Benirschke added a 50-yard field goal late in the opening quarter, before Brian Sipe led the Browns on a 5-play touchdown drive. San Diego also scored on 5 plays, the final three of which were Muncie runs of 17, 7, and 9 yards for the touchdown. Muncie had a 21-yard run on their next drive, ending with Benirschke's second field goal; San Diego led 20–7 at the interval.

San Diego opened the second half with another touchdown drive, this one finishing with Fouts' 13-yard touchdown pass to Brooks on 3rd and 3. The Browns responded with Sipe's second touchdown pass, which came on 4th down. Joiner's 51-yard catch-and-run on the following play from scrimmage took San Diego back into Cleveland territory, leading to Bauer's short touchdown catch. Cleveland had a 4th and goal from the San Diego 7-yard line late in the 3rd quarter—they again went for it, but Sipe threw incomplete. The Chargers took over on downs and Fouts immediately hit Joiner for a gain of 57 yards, setting up another field goal. Mike Williams and Bob Gregor had interceptions in the final quarter, either side of another Fouts' touchdown pass, to Ron Smith.

Joiner's 191 yards were the most he had in a single game as a Charger. Muncie rushed for 161 yards and added 23 receiving yards—it was the most combined yards he gained in any game throughout his career.

==== Week 2: vs. Detroit Lions ====
Week Two: Detroit Lions at San Diego Chargers – Game summary

Quarter	1	2	3	4	Total
Lions	3	0	10	10	**23**
**Chargers**	7	0	7	14	**28**

at Jack Murphy Stadium, San Diego, California

- Date: September 13
- Game time: 1:00 p.m. PDT
- Game weather: 73 °F (22.8 °C), relative humidity 81%, wind 11 miles per hour (18 km/h; 9.6 kn)
- Game attendance: 51,264
- Referee: Jerry Markbreit
- TV announcers (CBS): Tim Ryan and John Dockery
- Box score

Game information

**First quarter**

- SDG – Chuck Muncie 1-yard run (Rolf Benirschke kick), 11:18. Chargers 7–0. **Drive: 6 plays, 73 yards, 3:42.**
- DET – Eddie Murray 18-yard field goal, 1:44. Chargers 7–3. **Drive: 10 plays, 59 yards, 5:54.**

**Second quarter**

- No scoring plays.

**Third quarter**

- DET – Gary Danielson 11-yard run (Eddie Murray kick), 11:13. Lions 10–7. **Drive: 7 plays, 71 yards, 3:47.**
- DET – Eddie Murray 37-yard field goal, 9:28. Lions 13–7. **Drive: 3 plays, 8 yards, 1:26.**
- SDG – Kellen Winslow 7-yard pass from Dan Fouts (Rolf Benirschke kick), 6:13. Chargers 14–13. **Drive: 9 plays, 81 yards, 3:18.**

**Fourth quarter**

- DET – Billy Sims 12-yard run (Eddie Murray kick), 14:56. Lions 20–14. **Drive: 10 plays, 67 yards, 6:18.**
- SDG – Chuck Muncie 1-yard run (Rolf Benirschke kick), 9:57. Chargers 21–20. **Drive: 3 plays, 52 yards, 1:41.**
- DET – Eddie Murray 30-yard field goal, 4:32. Lions 23–21. **Drive: 14 plays, 51 yards, 5:24.**
- SDG – John Cappelletti 2-yard run (Rolf Benirschke kick), 0:56. Chargers 28–23. **Drive: 9 plays, 51 yards, 3:37.**

**Top passers**

- DET – Gary Danielson – 18/26, 213 yards, INT
- SDG – Dan Fouts – 18/25, 316 yards, TD, INT

**Top rushers**

- DET – Billy Sims – 23 rushes, 98 yards, TD
- SDG – Chuck Muncie – 15 rushes, 36 yards, 2 TD

**Top receivers**

- DET – Freddie Scott – 6 receptions, 84 yards
- SDG – Charlie Joiner – 7 receptions, 166 yards

As in their opening game, the Chargers scored on their first possession; Fouts converted a 3rd and 6 with a 24-yard pass to Muncie and followed it with a 40-yard completion to Joiner, setting up Muncie's touchdown two plays later. Fouts was intercepted near midfield on their next possession, and Detroit reached a 1st and goal at the San Diego 1-yard line. Louie Kelcher tackled Dexter Bussey for a 3-yard loss on the next play, and stopped Gary Danielson near the goal line on 3rd down, leading the Lions to kick a short field goal. Late in the second quarter the Lions gained a first down at the San Diego 20-yard line, but were pushed back by an offensive holding penalty and Kelcher's sack, eventually punting. The score remained 7–3 at halftime.

Detroit opened the second half with a 71-yard touchdown drive. Muncie lost a fumble on the next play from scrimmage, setting up a field goal. Joiner's 49-yard catch took the Chargers into Lions territory, and Winslow resorted their lead with a 9-yard catch on 3rd and 7. Detroit responded with a 67-yard touchdown drive, then forced a punt. Leroy Jones regained the ball for San Diego with a fumble recovery near midfield; from there, Fouts threw a 44-yard pass to Dwight Scales, setting up Muncie's second touchdown two plays later. Detroit successfully executed a fake punt on their next drive, eventually retaking the lead on a field goal with 4:32 to play. On the next drive, Fouts converted a 3rd and 1 with a quarterback sneak and a 3rd and 3 with a 15-yard completion to Winslow. John Cappelletti scored the winning touchdown on the next play. Needing a touchdown to win, Danielson was sacked by Jones on the ensuing drive but came back with three straight completions to reach the Chargers 8-yard line. From there, he was intercepted by Frank Duncan with a single second left in the game.

Joiner accounted for more than half the Chargers' receiving yards for the second consecutive game; he had 357 yards through the first two weeks.

==== Week 3: at Kansas City Chiefs ====
Week Three: San Diego Chargers at Kansas City Chiefs – Game summary

Quarter	1	2	3	4	Total
**Chargers**	14	14	7	7	**42**
Chiefs	7	7	14	3	**31**

at Arrowhead Stadium, Kansas City, Missouri

- Date: September 20
- Game time: 1:00 p.m. CDT
- Game weather: 68 °F (20 °C), relative humidity 54%, wind 14 miles per hour (23 km/h; 12 kn)
- Game attendance: 63,866
- Referee: Ben Dreith
- TV announcers (NBC): Mike Adamle & Rocky Bleier
- Box score

Game information

**First quarter**

- KAN – Ted McKnight 1-yard run (Nick Lowery kick), 9:12. Chiefs 7–0. **Drive: 10 plays, 44 yards, 5:48.**
- SDG – Kellen Winslow 13-yard pass from Dan Fouts (Rolf Benirschke kick), 4:13. Tied 7–7. **Drive: 8 plays, 64 yards, 2:58.**
- SDG – James Brooks 29-yard pass from Dan Fouts (Rolf Benirschke kick), 0:33. Chargers 14–7. **Drive: 4 plays, 47 yards, 1:36.**

**Second quarter**

- SDG – Chuck Muncie 1-yard run (Rolf Benirschke kick), 6:14. Chargers 21–7. **Drive: 8 plays, 84 yards, 4:51.**
- SDG – Eric Sievers 12-yard pass from Dan Fouts (Rolf Benirschke kick), 2:09. Chargers 28–7. **Drive: 1 play, 12 yards, 0:05.**
- KAN – Al Dixon 7-yard pass from Bill Kenney (Nick Lowery kick), 1:19. Chargers 28–14. **Drive: 5 plays, 76 yards, 0:50.**

**Third quarter**

- KAN – Ted McKnight 3-yard run (Nick Lowery kick), 10:38. Chargers 28–21. **Drive: 8 plays, 37 yards, 3:55.**
- SDG – Chuck Muncie 3-yard run (Rolf Benirschke kick), 7:42. Chargers 35–21. **Drive: 6 plays, 65 yards, 2:56.**
- KAN – Billy Jackson 4-yard run (Nick Lowery kick), 3:25. Chargers 35–28. **Drive: 9 plays, 80 yards, 4:17.**

**Fourth quarter**

- KAN – Nick Lowery 37-yard field goal, 10:07. Chargers 35–31. **Drive: 7 plays, 27 yards, 3:43.**
- SDG – Gary Johnson 5-yard lateral from Leroy Jones after interception and 6-yard return (Rolf Benirschke kick), 1:53. Chargers 42–31.

**Top passers**

- SDG – Dan Fouts – 22/43, 284 yards, 3 TD, 3 INT
- KAN – Bill Kenney – 22/41, 303 yards, TD, 5 INT

**Top rushers**

- SDG – Chuck Muncie – 17 rushes, 93 yards, 2 TD
- KAN – Joe Delaney – 9 rushes, 66 yards

**Top receivers**

- SDG – Kellen Winslow – 6 receptions, 96 yards, TD
- KAN – J. T. Smith – 9 receptions, 140 yards

Kansas City scored on the game's opening drive, and briefly had the ball in San Diego territory again when Frank Manumaleuga intercepted Fouts; Manumaleuga fumbled during the return and Eric Sievers recovered. San Diego tied the score on their second possession, which ended with consecutive completions from Fouts to Winslow of 24 and 13 yards for the touchdown. The Chiefs went three-and-out, and Brooks ran the punt back 23 yards to the Kansas City 47-yard line; he scored himself on a 29-yard catch four plays later. They extended their lead by going 84 yards in 8 plays—Sievers' 31-yard catch was the longest play, and with Muncie scored from the 1-yard line. Later, Linden King intercepted Chiefs quarterback Bill Kenney, and Fouts found Eric Sievers in the end zone a play later for a 21-point lead. Kenney covered 76 yards in five straight completions to begin the Kansas City comeback. In the final minute of the half, Fouts was intercepted in Kansas City territory, Irvin Phillips recovered a fumble, and San Diego ran out of time with the ball at the Chiefs 14-yard line, leaving the halftime score at 28–14.

In the 3rd quarter, Kansas City turned an interception into another touchdown. On the next drive, Muncie had a 30-yard run, a 32-yard reception and a 3-yard touchdown run. The Chiefs responded with an 80-yard touchdown drive, reducing the lead to 35–28. They reached midfield on their next possession, but Bob Gregor intercepted a tipped pass to stop the threat. Four plays later, the Chiefs pressured punter George Roberts into running; he was stopped well short of a first down, and Kansas City capitalised with a field goal. Trailing by four, the Chiefs moved the ball close to midfield on their next drive, but Willie Buchanon recovered a fumbled pitch. The Chargers went three-and-out, and Kansas City took over at their own 20-yard line. On 3rd and 12, King deflected a Kenney pass, Leroy Jones intercepted the ball and flipped it to Gary Johnson to run in for the clinching touchdown with 1:53 to play.

San Diego enjoyed an 8–3 advantage in takeaways; Buchanon had two interceptions and a fumble recovery. Muncie had 93 yards on the ground (with two touchdowns) and 85 through the air.

==== Week 4: at Denver Broncos ====
Week Four: San Diego Chargers at Denver Broncos – Game summary

Quarter	1	2	3	4	Total
Chargers	0	0	10	14	**24**
**Broncos**	21	7	7	7	**42**

at Mile High Stadium, Denver, Colorado

- Date: September 27
- Game time: 2:00 p.m. MDT
- Game weather: 63 °F (17.2 °C), relative humidity 28%, wind 7 miles per hour (11 km/h; 6.1 kn)
- Game attendance: 74,822
- Referee: Jerry Seeman
- TV announcers (NBC): Don Criqui and John Brodie
- Box score

Game information

**First quarter**

- DEN – Riley Odoms 19-yard pass from Craig Morton (Fred Steinfort kick), 6:23. Broncos 7–0. **Drive: 9 plays, 84 yards, 4:36.**
- DEN – Steve Watson 93-yard pass from Craig Morton (Fred Steinfort kick), 1:06. Broncos 14–0. **Drive: 1 play, 93 yards, 0:14.**
- DEN – James Wright 2-yard pass from Craig Morton (Fred Steinfort kick), 0:11. Broncos 21–0. **Drive: 2 plays, 2 yards, 0:45.**

**Second quarter**

- DEN – Steve Watson 21-yard pass from Craig Morton (Fred Steinfort kick), 6:19. Broncos 28–0. **Drive: 12 plays, 78 yards, 7:00.**

**Third quarter**

- DEN – Dave Preston 2-yard run (Fred Steinfort kick), 8:52. Broncos 35–0. **Drive: 6 plays, 28 yards, 4:27.**
- SDG – Ron Smith 39-yard pass from Dan Fouts (Rolf Benirschke kick), 6:59. Broncos 35–7. **Drive: 5 plays, 73 yards, 1:43.**
- SDG – Rolf Benirschke 52-yard field goal, 3:41. Broncos 35–10. **Drive: 7 plays, 29 yards, 1:20.**

**Fourth quarter**

- SDG – John Cappelletti 1-yard run (Rolf Benirschke kick), 13:41. Broncos 35–17. **Drive: 10 plays, 85 yards, 4:33.**
- SDG – Kellen Winslow 1-yard pass from Dan Fouts (Rolf Benirschke kick), 11:14. Broncos 35–24. **Drive: 4 plays, 25 yards, 2:39.**
- DEN – Rob Lytle 3-yard run (Fred Steinfort kick), 1:10. Broncos 42–24. **Drive: 7 plays, 34 yards, 3:47.**

**Top passers**

- SDG – Dan Fouts – 26/47, 298 yards, 2 TD, 3 INT
- DEN – Craig Morton – 17/18, 308 yards, 4 TD

**Top rushers**

- SDG – James Brooks – 7 rushes, 41 yards
- DEN – Larry Canada – 8 rushes, 43 yards

**Top receivers**

- SDG – Kellen Winslow – 10 receptions, 106 yards, TD
- DEN – Steve Watson – 8 receptions, 178 yards, 2 TD

After an exchange of punts, Denver converted a 3rd and 15 and went ahead to stay on Craig Morton's first touchdown pass. Another punt pinned Denver at their own 7-yard line, but Morton immediately threw a 93-yard touchdown drive to double the lead. Clarence Williams fumbled the ensuing kickoff, and Denver found the end zone again after two further plays; Morton had thrown touchdowns on three consecutive pass attempts. He added a fourth in four drives later, after Fouts was intercepted. Another Fouts interception didn't lead to points after Jones block a 43-yard field goal try. Time expired in the half with San Diego at the Denver 24-yard line, leaving them still 28–0 behind.

Denver added a fifth touchdown on their first possession of the third quarter and pulled Morton from the game. Dan Fouts found Ron Smith for a 39-yard touchdown five plays later to begin San Diego's recovery. The Broncos gained only one first down on their next two drives, while San Diego added a 52-yard Benirschke field goal and John Cappelletti's short touchdown run. Buchanon recovered a fumble on the next play, and Fouts found Winslow for a touchdown on 3rd and goal from the 1, pulling within 35–24 with 11:14 still to play. Morton returned to the game and soon had Denver poised score with a 1st and goal at the 4. Kelcher forced a fumble, which Buchanon recovered. Fouts was soon intercepted, but Wyatt Henderson forced yet another fumble, with Buchanon recovering again. Starting at their own 15, San Diego gained one first down before Cappelletti also lost a fumble; Denver recovered and finally scoring the clinching touchdown seven plays later.

Buchanon made three fumble recoveries in a span of 6 minutes and 27 seconds. Morton posted a perfect passer rating.

==== Week 5: vs. Seattle Seahawks ====
Week Five: Seattle Seahawks at San Diego Chargers – Game summary

Quarter	1	2	3	4	Total
Seahawks	0	7	0	3	**10**
**Chargers**	0	10	7	7	**24**

at Jack Murphy Stadium, San Diego, California

- Date: October 4
- Game time: 1:00 p.m. PDT
- Game weather: 69 °F (20.6 °C), relative humidity 69%, wind 8 miles per hour (13 km/h; 7.0 kn)
- Game attendance: 51,463
- Referee: Red Cashion
- TV announcers (NBC): Merle Harmon and George Kunz
- Box score

Game information

**First quarter**

- No scoring plays.

**Second quarter**

- SEA – Steve Largent 34-yard pass from Jim Zorn (Efren Herrera kick), 14:54. Seahawks 7–0. **Drive: 9 plays, 84 yards, 3:48.**
- SDG – Rolf Benirschke 47-yard field goal, 11:54. Seahawks 7–3. **Drive: 6 plays, 51 yards, 3:00.**
- SDG – Kellen Winslow 9-yard pass from Dan Fouts (Rolf Benirschke kick), 2:38. Chargers 10–7. **Drive: 11 plays, 83 yards, 5:26.**

**Third quarter**

- SDG – Charlie Joiner 12-yard pass from Dan Fouts (Rolf Benirschke kick), 4:50. Chargers 17–7. **Drive: 12 plays, 78 yards, 6:57.**

**Fourth quarter**

- SEA – Efren Herrera 20-yard field goal, 10:30. Chargers 17–10. **Drive: 4 plays, 32 yards, 3:09.**
- SDG – Charlie Joiner 11-yard pass from Dan Fouts (Rolf Benirschke kick), 3:56. Chargers 24–10. **Drive: 13 plays, 80 yards, 6:27.**

**Top passers**

- SEA – Jim Zorn – 16/34, 229 yards, TD, INT
- SDG – Dan Fouts – 30/41, 302 yards, 3 TD

**Top rushers**

- SEA – Jim Zorn – 6 rushes, 29 yards
- SDG – John Cappelletti – 14 rushes, 85 yards

**Top receivers**

- SEA – Steve Largent – 5 receptions, 118 yards, TD
- SDG – Clarence Williams – 10 receptions, 89 yards

Pete Shaw intercepted Jim Zorn four plays into the game, but Cappelletti fumbled the ball back after two further plays. After a series of punts, Seattle converted three 3rd downs and scored through Steve Largent. Cappelletti had a 30-yard run on the next play, leading to Benirschke's 47-yard field goal. Early in their next drive, Fouts converted a 3rd and 4 with a 13-yard pass to Winslow; the pair combined again for a touchdown on 3rd and goal from the 9-yard line. Don Macek prevented a Seahawks scoring chance when he recovered a Fouts fumble in the final seconds of the half, which ended with San Diego 10–7 ahead.

The Chargers converted three 3rd downs on their second possession of the 3rd quarter, including Joiner's 12-yard touchdown on 3rd and 4. Seattle had a scoring chance late in the quarter after recovering a Fouts fumble at his own 19-yard line. The Seahawks reached 4th and goal from the 1-yard line and went for the touchdown, but were stopped for no gain by San Diego's defensive line. After a Chargers three-and-out, Seattle soon approached the goal line again but settled for a field goal on 4th and goal from the 2. San Diego responded with a 13-play, 80-yard touchdown drive, with Joiner's second touchdown coming on 3rd and 8 from the 11-yard line. Seattle turned the ball over on downs at the San Diego 44, and the Chargers ran off the final 2:37 of the game.

Muncie was absent with a hand injury, but Cappelletti filled in with 85 yards rushing and 28 receiving. Wes Chandler debuted with 5 receptions for 37 yards. With Seattle focusing on stopping long passes, none of Fouts' 30 completions went for more than 15 yards.

==== Week 6: vs. Minnesota Vikings ====
Week Six: Minnesota Vikings at San Diego Chargers – Game summary

Quarter	1	2	3	4	Total
**Vikings**	0	14	10	9	**33**
Chargers	7	7	10	7	**31**

at Jack Murphy Stadium, San Diego, California

- Date: October 11
- Game time: 1:00 p.m. PDT
- Game weather: 68 °F (20 °C), relative humidity 69%, wind 13 miles per hour (21 km/h; 11 kn)
- Game attendance: 50,708
- Referee: Chuck Heberling
- TV announcers (CBS): Gary Bender and Fred Dryer
- Box score

Game information

**First quarter**

- SDG – Chuck Muncie 2-yard run (Rolf Benirschke kick), 3:11. Chargers 7–0. **Drive: 2 plays, 2 yards, 0:45.**

**Second quarter**

- MIN – Rickey Young 15-yard pass from Tommy Kramer (Rick Danmeier kick), 14:47. Tied 7–7. **Drive: 9 plays, 66 yards, 3:24.**
- MIN – Ted Brown 4-yard pass from Tommy Kramer (Rick Danmeier kick), 9:00. Vikings 14–7. **Drive: 11 plays, 71 yards, 5:10.**
- SDG – Dwight Scales 60-yard pass from Dan Fouts (Rolf Benirschke kick), 6:45. Tied 14–14. **Drive: 4 plays, 73 yards, 2:11.**

**Third quarter**

- SDG – Rolf Benirschke 39-yard field goal, 9:43. Chargers 17–14. **Drive: 8 plays, 48 yards, 3:32.**
- MIN – Terry LeCount 26-yard pass from Tommy Kramer (Rick Danmeier kick), 6:28. Vikings 21–17. **Drive: 7 plays, 92 yards, 3:15.**
- SDG – Charlie Joiner 38-yard pass from Dan Fouts (Rolf Benirschke kick), 4:32. Chargers 24–21. **Drive: 6 plays, 74 yards, 1:56.**
- MIN – Rick Danmeier 28-yard field goal, 2:35. Tied 24–24. **Drive: 4 plays, 64 yards, 1:17.**

**Fourth quarter**

- SDG – Chuck Muncie 1-yard run (Rolf Benirschke kick), 10:47. Chargers 31–24. **Drive: 15 plays, 74 yards, 6:48.**
- MIN – Terry LeCount 43-yard pass from Tommy Kramer (kick failed), 1:51. Chargers 31–30. **Drive: 4 plays, 72 yards, 0:35.**
- MIN – Rick Danmeier 38-yard field goal, 0:00. Vikings 33–31. **Drive: 5 plays, 22 yards, 1:49.**

**Top passers**

- MIN – Tommy Kramer – 27/43, 444 yards, 4 TD, 2 INT
- SDG – Dan Fouts – 20/38, 310 yards, 2 TD

**Top rushers**

- MIN – Ted Brown – 21 rushes, 68 yards
- SDG – Chuck Muncie – 21 rushes, 102 yards, 2 TD

**Top receivers**

- MIN – Terry LeCount – 6 receptions, 120 yards, 2 TD
- SDG – Charlie Joiner – 6 receptions, 97 yards, TD

Vikings quarterback Tommy Kramer was intercepted twice in the 1st quarter — one pick, by Buchanon, came on 2nd and 12 from the San Diego 22-yard line to stop a scoring chance; the other was run back by 36 yards by Johnson to the Minnesota 2-yard line. Muncie opened the scoring two plays later. Kramer threw touchdown passes on the next two possessions to put the Vikings ahead. Fouts responded with a 60-yard touchdown to Dwight Scales, who dove to catch the ball inside the 10, got to his feet untouched and crossed the goal-line. Late in the half, Chandler caught a 20-yard pass on 3rd and 19, moving the ball to the Minnesota 15-yard line. The drive stalled, Benirschke missed a field goal from 31 yards out, and it remained 14–14 at halftime.

Benirschke made a 39-yarder in the 3rd quarter. Kramer and Fouts then led a pair of quick scoring drives, with Terry LeCount and Joiner getting touchdown receptions. Kramer started the next drive with a 63-yard completion, and a Rick Danmeier field goal made it 24–24. The Chargers responded with a touchdown drive that featured eight plays inside the Minnesota 11-yard: Fouts converted a 4th and 1 from the 2 with a quarterback sneak and Muncie scored on 4th and goal from the 1. Minnesota responded by moving to the San Diego 20, but John Woodcock knocked the ball from Kramer's hands and recovered it himself. San Diego ran the clock down inside 3 minutes before opting to go for it on 4th and 2 from the Vikings 30. Muncie gained the first down but lost a fumble. Kramer threw a 43-yard to LeCount, but Danmeier missed the game-tying extra point attempt. He then succeeded with an onside kick, recovered by LeCount. The Vikings reached another 1st and 10 at the San Diego 20-yard line. Kramer fumbled the next snap, but Minnesota recovered; two plays later, Danmeier hit the winning field goal from 38 yards out as time expired.

Kramer's 444 passing yards represented the first 400-yard passing game by an opponent in Chargers history. Three Vikings had 100-yard receiving games.

==== Week 7: at Baltimore Colts ====
Week Seven: San Diego Chargers at Baltimore Colts – Game summary

Quarter	1	2	3	4	Total
**Chargers**	7	16	7	13	**43**
Colts	7	0	7	0	**14**

at Memorial Stadium, Baltimore, Maryland

- Date: October 18
- Game time: 2:00 p.m. EDT
- Game weather: 53 °F (11.7 °C), relative humidity 73%, wind 10 miles per hour (16 km/h; 8.7 kn)
- Game attendance: 41,921
- Referee: Bob McElwee
- TV announcers (NBC): Phil Stone & Gene Washington
- Box score

Game information

**First quarter**

- BAL – Roger Carr 29-yard pass from Bert Jones (Mike Wood kick), 9:41. Colts 7–0. **Drive: 5 plays, 56 yards, 1:35.**
- SDG – Chuck Muncie 3-yard run (Rolf Benirschke kick), 3:20. Tied 7–7. **Drive: 14 plays, 80 yards, 6:21.**

**Second quarter**

- SDG – John Cappelletti 12-yard pass from Dan Fouts (kick blocked), 4:55. Chargers 13–7. **Drive: 7 plays, 55 yards, 3:09.**
- SDG – Charlie Joiner 23-yard pass from Dan Fouts (Rolf Benirschke kick), 7:30. Chargers 20–7. **Drive: 11 plays, 78 yards, 4:30.**
- SDG – Rolf Benirschke 30-yard field goal, 0:05. Chargers 23–7. **Drive: 12 plays, 67 yards, 3:43.**

**Third quarter**

- SDG – Chuck Muncie 3-yard run (Rolf Benirschke kick), 11:25. Chargers 30–7. **Drive: 2 plays, 31 yards, 0:11.**
- BAL – Curtis Dickey 5-yard pass from Bert Jones (Mike Wood kick), 5:35. Chargers 30–14. **Drive: 12 plays, 88 yards, 5:40.**

**Fourth quarter**

- SDG – John Cappelletti 1-yard run (kick failed), 10:18. Chargers 36–14. **Drive: 9 plays, 61 yards, 4:27.**
- SDG – Clarence Williams 7-yard pass from Dan Fouts (Rolf Benirschke kick), 3:23. Chargers 43–14. **Drive: 6 plays, 30 yards, 3:35.**

**Top passers**

- SDG – Dan Fouts – 26/43, 298 yards, 3 TD
- BAL – Bert Jones – 20/37, 255 yards, 2 TD, 2 INT

**Top rushers**

- SDG – James Brooks – 14 rushes, 72 yards
- BAL – Curtis Dickey – 6 rushes, 32 yards

**Top receivers**

- SDG – Charlie Joiner – 6 receptions, 82 yards, TD
- BAL – Roger Carr – 3 receptions, 63 yards, TD

Scales fumbled at midfield on the first San Diego possession. Baltimore didn't score from that opportunity, but drove for a touchdown on their second possession. The Chargers responded with a 14-play touchdown drive; Fouts' 11-yard run on 3rd and 10 was one of three third down conversions, and Muncie ran in the tying score from the 3-yard line. Woodrow Lowe came up with an interception on the next play from scrimmage, setting up a shorter drive that Cappelletti finished with a 12-yard touchdown reception. Following a Baltimore punt, the Chargers made it three touchdown drives in a row, Joiner scoring from 23 yards out. A Williams interception stopped a Colts drive that had reached the San Diego 30-yard line, and Benirschke added a field goal shortly before halftime, increasing the lead to 23–7.

In the 3rd quarter, Brooks had a 21-yard punt return to the Baltimore 31-yard line, and the Chargers scored in two plays—Winslow's 28-yard reception and Muncie's 3-yard run. The Colts responded with their second touchdown on the next drive, but came no closer. Cappelletti and Williams added further touchdowns in the final quarter.

San Diego had 298 yards and three touchdowns through the air, with 172 yards and three more touchdowns on the ground. Keith Ferguson had three of the Chargers' six sacks. There was a three-way tie atop the AFC West, with San Diego, Denver and Kansas City all at 5–2.

==== Week 8: at Chicago Bears ====
Week Eight: San Diego Chargers at Chicago Bears – Game summary

Quarter	1	2	3	4	OT	Total
Chargers	0	3	0	14	0	**17**
**Bears**	7	3	0	7	3	**20**

at Soldier Field, Chicago, Illinois

- Date: October 25
- Game time: 3:00 p.m. CST
- Game weather: 39 °F (3.9 °C), relative humidity 55%, wind 9 miles per hour (14 km/h; 7.8 kn)
- Game attendance: 52,906
- Referee: Gordon McCarter
- TV announcers (NBC): Phil Stone and Gene Washington
- Box score

Game information

**First quarter**

- CHI – Matt Suhey 7-yard run (John Roveto kick), 3:42. Bears 7–0. **Drive: 13 plays, 54 yards, 5:56.**

**Second quarter**

- SDG – Rolf Benirschke 18-yard field goal, 13:40. Bears 7–3. **Drive: 4 plays, 28 yards, 2:08.**
- CHI – John Roveto 31-yard field goal, 3:21. Bears 10–3. **Drive: 9 plays, 51 yards, 4:19.**

**Third quarter**

- No scoring plays.

**Fourth quarter**

- SDG – Charlie Joiner 22-yard pass from Dan Fouts (Rolf Benirschke kick), 10:15. Tied 10–10. **Drive: 12 plays, 80 yards, 5:24.**
- CHI – Walter Payton 2-yard run (John Roveto kick), 9:41. Bears 17–10. **Drive: 13 plays, 76 yards, 7:16.**
- SDG – Wes Chandler 39-yard pass from Dan Fouts (Rolf Benirschke kick), 3:23. Tied 17–17. **Drive: 7 plays, 74 yards, 1:19.**

**Overtime**

- CHI – John Roveto 26-yard field goal, 5:30. Bears 20–17. **Drive: 7 plays, 18 yards, 4:06.**

**Top passers**

- SDG – Dan Fouts – 13/43, 295 yards, 2 TD, 2 INT
- CHI – Vince Evans – 17/39, 219 yards

**Top rushers**

- SDG – James Brooks – 7 rushes, 39 yards
- CHI – Walter Payton – 36 rushes, 107 yards, TD

**Top receivers**

- SDG – Charlie Joiner – 5 receptions, 124 yards, TD
- CHI – Ken Margerum – 4 receptions, 83 yards

In the 1st quarter, Matt Suhey converted a 4th and 1 for Chicago and later scored the opening touchdown. The Chargers almost tied the score early in the 2nd quarter, but Joiner was stopped a yard short on 3rd and goal from the 18, and they settled for a short field goal. Chicago kicker John Roveto made a field goal late in the half, before Fouts and Chandler connected for 30 yards to the Chicago 38-yard line. After a short run by Muncie, Fouts three three incompletions and the Chargers turned the ball over on downs. It remained 10–3 at half time.

San Diego's passing attack improved in the second half; Fouts found Joiner for 45 yards, but Benirschke missed a long field goal. Roveto appeared to have converted a field goal on the next drive, but the Chargers were flagged for roughing the kicker, and the drive continued. After Woodrow Lowe tackled Walter Payton a yard short of the end zone on 3rd and goal, Roveto missed an 18-yard attempt. The Chargers then drove 80 yards for the game-tying score, Fouts hitting Winslow for 8 yards on 4th and 3 and Joiner scoring from 22 yards out. Chicago responded with a seven-minute drive, Suhey converting another 4th down before Payton restored the seven-point lead with three minutes to play. San Diego quickly reached the Bears 39-yard line in response, from where Fouts threw two incompletions. On 3rd and 10 he threw to the end zone, where the ball was tipped in the air and caught by Chandler for his first Chargers touchdown. The Bears punted on their final possession of regulation time, then Winslow caught a 31-yard pass but was tackled at the Chicago 25-yard line with no time on the clock.

Chicago won the overtime coin toss, but went three-and-out. San Diego reached the Chicago 40-yard line, but were driven back by a holding penalty and Fouts was intercepted on 3rd and 18 from midfield. After San Diego's defense again forced a three-and-out, Fouts was intercepted for a second time on 3rd and 10 from his own 43. The Bears took over on the Chargers 27-yard line after the turnover, and Roveto kicked the game-winner seven plays later from 26 yards out.

Fouts completed 3 of 18 in the first half, 10 of 19 in the second, and 0 of 6 in overtime. Chicago controlled the ball for 48:50 compared to only 20:40 for San Diego.

==== Week 9: vs. Kansas City Chiefs ====
Week Nine: Kansas City Chiefs at San Diego Chargers – Game summary

Quarter	1	2	3	4	Total
Chiefs	7	0	7	6	**20**
**Chargers**	7	12	0	3	**22**

at Jack Murphy Stadium, San Diego, California

- Date: November 1
- Game time: 1:00 p.m. PST
- Game weather: 68 °F (20 °C), relative humidity 32%, wind 6 miles per hour (9.7 km/h; 5.2 kn)
- Game attendance: 51,307
- Referee: Gene Barth
- TV announcers (NBC): Phil Stone and Gene Washington
- Box score

Game information

**First quarter**

- SDG – Chuck Muncie 1-yard run (Rolf Benirschke kick), 10:19. Chargers 7–0. **Drive: 7 plays, 50 yards, 2:34.**
- KAN – James Hadnot 2-yard run (Nick Lowery kick), 3:36. Tied 7–7. **Drive: 11 plays, 72 yards, 6:43.**

**Second quarter**

- SDG – Chuck Muncie 4-yard run (kick failed), 4:10. Chargers 13–7. **Drive: 5 plays, 71 yards, 2:32.**
- SDG – Rolf Benirschke 29-yard field goal, 0:30. Chargers 16–7. **Drive: 9 plays, 56 yards, 1:26.**
- SDG – Rolf Benirschke 19-yard field goal, 0:00. Chargers 19–7. **Drive: 2 plays, 32 yards, 0:19.**

**Third quarter**

- KAN – Billy Jackson 2-yard pass from Bill Kenney (Nick Lowery kick), 11:55. Chargers 19–14. **Drive: 4 plays, 56 yards, 1:39.**

**Fourth quarter**

- KAN – Nick Lowery 21-yard field goal, 14:50. Chargers 19–17. **Drive: 13 plays, 78 yards, 7:15.**
- KAN – Nick Lowery 32-yard field goal, 6:32. Chiefs 20–19. **Drive: 10 plays, 49 yards, 6:25.**
- SDG – Rolf Benirschke 22-yard field goal, 0:13. Chargers 22–20. **Drive: 14 plays, 70 yards, 6:04.**

**Top passers**

- KAN – Bill Kenney – 13/22, 190 yards, TD
- SDG – Dan Fouts – 24/39, 297 yards, INT

**Top rushers**

- KAN – Joe Delaney – 23 rushes, 117 yards
- SDG – Chuck Muncie – 16 rushes, 63 yards, 2 TD

**Top receivers**

- KAN – J. T. Smith – 5 receptions, 92 yards
- SDG – Chuck Muncie – 6 receptions, 71 yards

Johnson got San Diego off to a good start with a fumble recovery at midfield after only two minutes. Muncie scored seven plays later, and the Chiefs levelled the score on their next possession. Kansas City had a 3rd and 4 at the San Diego 32-yard line late in the opening quarter, but King and Jimmy Webb shared a sack of Kenney, setting the Chiefs back 10 yards and causing them to punt. In the second quarter, a Winslow fumble set Kansas City up in Chargers territory, but Woodcock recovered another fumble four plays later. The offense then covered 71 yards in only five plays, Fouts finding Joiner for 29 yards and Eric Sievers for 31 before Muncie scored from the 4-yard line. Benirschke missed the extra point, but converted a 29-yard field goal with 30 seconds left in the half. Kansas City lost their third fumble on the ensuing kickoff, with Wyatt Henderson recovering. A 24-yard Chandler catch and a pass interference penalty moved the ball to the Kansas City 1-yard line, but only three seconds remained and the Chargers took a short field goal for a 19–7 lead.

San Diego were unable to cross midfield on the first four possessions of the second half, turning the ball over twice on a Joiner fumble and a Fouts interception. Kansas City scored a touchdown and two field goals on their own first four possessions and led 20–19 with 6:32 to play in the 4th quarter. San Diego began their winning drive on their own 26. Fouts converted a pair of 3rd downs with completions to Joiner and Winslow, then faced a 4th and 9 at the Kansas City 47 on the first play after the two minute warning. Wes Chandler's 23-yard catch kept the drive going. After one further first down, Benirschke kicked the game-winner from 22 yards out with 13 seconds remaining.

Muncie led the Chargers in both rushing and receiving, accounting for 134 yards of offense. The result once again produced a three-way tie atop the AFC West, with the Chargers, Chiefs and Broncos now at 6–3.

==== Week 10: vs. Cincinnati Bengals ====
Week Ten: Cincinnati Bengals at San Diego Chargers – Game summary

Quarter	1	2	3	4	Total
**Bengals**	10	21	0	9	**40**
Chargers	0	10	0	7	**17**

at Jack Murphy Stadium, San Diego, California

- Date: November 8
- Game time: 1:00 p.m. PST
- Game weather: 65 °F (18.3 °C), relative humidity 73%, wind 9 miles per hour (14 km/h; 7.8 kn)
- Game attendance: 51,259
- Referee: Fred Silva
- TV announcers (NBC): Dick Enberg & Merlin Olsen
- Box score

Game information

**First quarter**

- CIN – Isaac Curtis 4-yard pass from Ken Anderson (Jim Breech kick), 10:07. Bengals 7–0. **Drive: 4 plays, 24 yards, 1:58.**
- CIN – Jim Breech 43-yard field goal, 0:00. Bengals 10–0. **Drive: 9 plays, 64 yards, 4:00.**

**Second quarter**

- SDG – Wes Chandler 26 yard-pass from Dan Fouts (Rolf Benirschke kick), 10:38. Bengals 10–7. **Drive: 9 plays, 81 yards, 4:22.**
- CIN – Steve Kreider 10-yard pass from Ken Anderson (Jim Breech kick), 5:49. Bengals 17–7. **Drive: 9 plays, 69 yards, 2:41.**
- CIN – Charles Alexander 1-yard run (Jim Breech kick), 1:57. Bengals 24–7. **Drive: 7 plays, 35 yards, 2:31.**
- CIN – Louis Breeden 102-yard interception return (Jim Breech kick), 0:34. Bengals 31–7.
- SDG – Rolf Benirschke 47-yard field goal, 0:04. Bengals 31–10. **Drive: 3 plays, 42 yards, 0:30.**

**Third quarter**

- No scoring plays.

**Fourth quarter**

- CIN – Jim Breech 33-yard field goal, 5:11. Bengals 34–10. **Drive: 13 plays, 65 yards, 7:16.**
- CIN – Pete Johnson 2-yard run (kick failed), 4:14. Bengals 40–10. **Drive: 2 plays, 4 yards, 0:41.**
- SDG – Wes Chandler 51-yard pass from Dan Fouts (Rolf Benirschke kick), 2:45. Bengals 40–17. **Drive: 3 plays, 64 yards, 1:19.**

**Top passers**

- CIN – Ken Anderson – 18/28, 288 yards, 2 TD, INT
- SDG – Dan Fouts – 20/40, 352 yards, 2 TD, 2 INT

**Top rushers**

- CIN – Pete Johnson – 20 rushes, 42 yards, TD
- SDG – Chuck Muncie – 17 rushes, 90 yards

**Top receivers**

- CIN – Isaac Curtis – 8 receptions, 147 yards, TD
- SDG – Wes Chandler – 10 receptions, 194 yards, 2 TD

Joiner fumbled on the Chargers' second play from scrimmage, and Cincinnati had to drive only 24 yards for their opening touchdown. The Bengals were stopped in Chargers territory by a Shaw fumble recovery, then added a field goal late in the opening quarter. Chandler pulled San Diego within three points with a 26-yard touchdown catch. Cincinnati's offense made more chances. A 68-yard pass took them to the San Diego 11-yard line before Williams stopped them with an end zone interception. The Bengals forced a three-and-out and scored touchdowns on consecutive possessions either side of a Fouts fumble. Trailing by seventeen points with less than two minutes to play before halftime, San Diego moved the ball with a 27-yard Brooks run and a 56-yard Scales reception to the Cincinnati 4-yard line. From there Fouts was intercepted by Louis Breeden, who returned the ball 102 yards for the game-breaking touchdown. Benirschke made a 47-yard field goal with four seconds remaining in the half, but the Bengals still maintained a 31–10 lead.

After a scoreless 3rd quarter, San Diego reached a 1st and 10 at the Cincinnati 18-yard line. Fouts was sacked and intercepted on consecutive plays, and the Bengals drove 65 yards to add a field goal. Brooks' fumbled kickoff return led to more Bengals points, then Chandler scored a late consolation touchdown.

Fouts was sacked six times after not getting sacked at all in the previous three games. Bengals safety Mike Fuller had spent the previous six seasons with the Chargers. He later revealed that San Diego had not changed their defensive signals since the 1980 season; Fuller was able to interpret them and give the Bengals offense an edge in this game.

==== Week 11: at Seattle Seahawks ====
Week Eleven: San Diego Chargers at Seattle Seahawks – Game summary

Quarter	1	2	3	4	Total
Chargers	7	10	0	6	**23**
**Seahawks**	0	24	14	6	**44**

at Kingdome, Seattle, Washington

- Date: November 16
- Game time: 6:00 p.m. PST
- Game weather: Dome
- Game attendance: 58,628
- Referee: Bob Frederic
- TV announcers (ABC): Frank Gifford, Don Meredith and Howard Cosell
- Box score

Game information

**First quarter**

- SDG – Chuck Muncie 1-yard run (Rolf Benirschke kick), 6:35. Chargers 7–0. **Drive: 15 plays, 78 yards, 7:49.**

**Second quarter**

- SEA – Efren Herrera 25-yard field goal, 12:43. Chargers 7–3. **Drive: 11 plays, 73 yards, 3:47.**
- SEA – Theotis Brown 2-yard run (Efren Herrera kick), 11:27. Seahawks 10–7. **Drive: 4 plays, 44 yards, 1:03.**
- SEA – Sherman Smith 18-yard pass from Jim Zorn (Efren Herrera kick), 5:56. Seahawks 17–7. **Drive: 6 plays, 44 yards, 2:30.**
- SDG – Chuck Muncie 73-yard run (Rolf Benirschke kick), 4:26. Seahawks 17–14. **Drive: 3 plays, 89 yards, 1:22.**
- SEA – Theotis Brown 1-yard run (Efren Herrera kick), 0:57. Seahawks 24–14. **Drive: 7 plays, 61 yards, 3:18.**
- SDG – Rolf Benirschke 32-yard field goal, 0:03. Seahawks 24–17. **Drive: 7 plays, 62 yards, 0:45.**

**Third quarter**

- SEA – Dan Doornink 80-yard pass from Jim Zorn (Efren Herrera kick), 5:46. Seahawks 31–17. **Drive: 5 plays, 99 yards, 2:28.**
- SEA – Dan Doornink 3-yard run (Efren Herrera kick), 0:12. Seahawks 38–17. **Drive: 7 plays, 55 yards, 4:11.**

**Fourth quarter**

- SEA – Efren Herrera 30-yard field goal, 13:05. Seahawks 41–17. **Drive: 4 plays, 4 yards, 1:31.**
- SDG – Wes Chandler 22-yard pass from Dan Fouts (kick blocked), 11:39. Seahawks 41–23. **Drive: 6 plays, 59 yards, 1:15.**
- SEA – Efren Herrera 23-yard field goal, 6:11. Seahawks 44–23. **Drive: 8 plays, 36 yards, 5:12.**

**Top passers**

- SDG – Dan Fouts – 20/34, 252 yards, TD, INT
- SEA – Jim Zorn – 11/22, 212 yards, 2 TD

**Top rushers**

- SDG – Chuck Muncie – 20 rushes, 151 yards, 2 TD
- SEA – Theotis Brown – 18 rushes, 83 yards, 2 TD

**Top receivers**

- SDG – Kellen Winslow – 7 receptions, 106 yards
- SEA – Dan Doornink – 1 reception, 80 yards, TD

San Diego converted four 3rd downs on their opening possession, with Muncie scoring on 3rd and goal from the 1-yard line. Brooks fumbled the kickoff after a Seahawks field goal early in the 2nd quarter, leading to the first Seattle touchdown; he fumbled while running the ball on the next Chargers drive, leading to another one. Three plays later, Muncie broke clear up the left sideline for a 73-yard touchdown. Seattle faced a 3rd and 10 from the San Diego 30-yard line late in the half. Jim Zorn threw incomplete to Steve Largent, but Henderson was flagged for a 29-yard pass interference penalty and Seattle soon scored another touchdown. Benirschke cut the halftime deficit to 24–17 with a 32-yard field goal.

The Chargers came close to tying the score on the opening possession of the second half, reaching the Seattle 1-yard line before Muncie was stuffed for no gain on both 3rd and 4th down. Seattle moved to a 3rd and 6 from their 20, from where Dan Doornink took a pass in the flat 80 yards for a touchdown. Muncie fumbled soon afterwards, and Doornink scored again—the fifth Seattle touchdown in as many drives. They added two field goals in the 4th quarter, either side of a Chandler touchdown.

Muncie's second touchdown was the longest of his career. San Diego outgained Seattle by 486 yards to 368, but committed all four of the game's turnovers. With five weeks to go, San Diego stood two games back from Denver and one behind Kansas City.

==== Week 12: at Oakland Raiders ====
Week Twelve: San Diego Chargers at Oakland Raiders – Game summary

Quarter	1	2	3	4	Total
**Chargers**	7	21	20	7	**55**
Raiders	7	14	0	0	**21**

at Oakland-Alameda County Coliseum, Oakland, California

- Date: November 22
- Game time: 1:00 p.m. PST
- Game weather: 60 °F (15.6 °C), relative humidity 96%, wind 9 miles per hour (14 km/h; 7.8 kn)
- Game attendance: 50,199
- Referee: Ben Dreith
- TV announcers (NBC): Charlie Jones & Len Dawson
- Box score

Game information

**First quarter**

- OAK – Derrick Ramsey 66-yard pass from Marc Wilson (Chris Bahr kick), 4:50. Raiders 7–0. **Drive: 5 plays, 90 yards, 1:50.**
- SDG – Chuck Muncie 1-yard run (Rolf Benirschke kick), 2:16. Tied 7–7. **Drive: 8 plays, 58 yards, 2:34.**

**Second quarter**

- OAK – Derrick Jensen 2-yard run (Chris Bahr kick), 13:55. Raiders 14–7. **Drive: 1 play, 2 yards, 0:02.**
- SDG – James Brooks 12-yard pass from Dan Fouts (Rolf Benirschke kick), 9:32. Tied 14–14. **Drive: 5 plays, 29 yards, 1:43.**
- OAK – Marc Wilson 12-yard run (Chris Bahr kick), 5:53. Raiders 21–14. **Drive: 10 plays, 71 yards, 3:39.**
- SDG – Kellen Winslow 15-yard pass from Dan Fouts (Rolf Benirschke kick), 3:06. Tied 21–21. **Drive: 10 plays, 80 yards, 2:47.**
- SDG – Kellen Winslow 29-yard pass from Dan Fouts (Rolf Benirschke kick), 1:52. Chargers 28–21. **Drive: 2 plays, 40 yards, 0:50.**

**Third quarter**

- SDG – Kellen Winslow 4-yard pass from Dan Fouts (Rolf Benirschke kick), 12:38. Chargers 35–21. **Drive: 5 plays, 21 yards, 2:06.**
- SDG – Kellen Winslow 5-yard pass from Dan Fouts (kick blocked), 8:34. Chargers 41–21. **Drive: 8 plays, 26 yards, 3:47.**
- SDG – Charlie Joiner 6-yard pass from Dan Fouts (Rolf Benirschke kick), 2:23. Chargers 48–21. **Drive: 12 plays, 58 yards, 5:28.**

**Fourth quarter**

- SDG – Kellen Winslow 3-yard pass from Chuck Muncie (Rolf Benirschke kick), 1:59. Chargers 55–21. **Drive: 10 plays, 56 yards, 6:30.**

**Top passers**

- SDG – Dan Fouts – 28/44, 296 yards, 6 TD, INT
- OAK – Marc Wilson – 12/24, 203 yards, TD, 2 INT

**Top rushers**

- SDG – James Brooks – 17 rushes, 97 yards
- OAK – Kenny King – 8 rushes, 21 yards

**Top receivers**

- SDG – Kellen Winslow – 13 receptions, 144 yards, 5 TD
- OAK – Derrick Ramsey – 4 receptions, 122 yards, TD

Oakland scored first via a long touchdown pass. On the next drive, Fouts connected with Scales for 21 yards on a 3rd and 8 from the Seattle 22-yard line, and Muncie scored on the next play. Early in the 2nd quarter, a Fouts interception was run back to the San Diego 2-yard line; the Raiders retook the lead on the next play. San Diego levelled the score again after Brooks' 42-yard punt return set up his own touchdown catch from the 12. Oakland took their third and final lead on the next drive. In response, Fouts converted 3rd downs with completions to Chandler and Winslow, leading to Winslow's first touchdown catch. The Raiders went three-and-out, and Brooks ran the punt back 37 yards to the Oakland 40-yard line. Brooks added an 11-yard catch, then Winslow scored from 29 yards out for a 28–21 halftime lead.

Oakland's first two offensive plays of the second half saw Marc Wilson intercepted by Bob Horn and Pete Shaw, setting up the Charger offense with short fields. Both times, Fouts found Winslow with touchdown passes, the latter coming 6:26 into the 3rd quarter — the pair had combined for four touchdowns in four possessions, across a span of just 9 minutes and 32 seconds of game time. When Fouts combined with Joiner for a score on the next Charger drive, the quarterback had thrown six touchdowns in as many possessions. Shaw had another interception 4th quarter and the Chargers drove to their final touchdown; Muncie ran a halfback option and found a wide-open Winslow in the end zone.

As of 2025, Winslow's five touchdowns remain tied for an NFL record, while Fouts' six touchdowns are a Chargers record for a single game. On defense, Gary Johnson had four of the team's seven sacks.

==== Week 13: vs. Denver Broncos ====
Week Thirteen: Denver Broncos at San Diego Chargers – Game summary

Quarter	1	2	3	4	Total
Broncos	0	10	0	7	**17**
**Chargers**	14	13	7	0	**34**

at Jack Murphy Stadium, San Diego, California

- Date: November 29
- Game time: 1:00 p.m. PST
- Game weather: 57 °F (13.9 °C), relative humidity 86%, wind 7 miles per hour (11 km/h; 6.1 kn)
- Game attendance: 51,533
- Referee: Bob McElwee
- TV announcers (NBC): Phil Stone & John Brodie
- Box score

Game information

**First quarter**

- SDG – Chuck Muncie 14-yard run (Rolf Benirschke kick), 12:22. Chargers 7–0. **Drive: 6 plays, 74 yards, 2:38.**
- SDG – Chuck Muncie 1-yard run (Rolf Benirschke kick), 7:53. Chargers 14–0. **Drive: 6 plays, 61 yards, 3:07.**

**Second quarter**

- DEN – Larry Canada 4-yard run (Fred Steinfort kick), 14:52. Chargers 14–7. **Drive: 8 plays, 77 yards, 3:47.**
- SDG – Chuck Muncie 4-yard run (kick failed), 8:35. Chargers 20–7. **Drive: 2 plays, 13 yards, 0:53.**
- DEN – Fred Steinfort 21-yard field goal, 4:05. Chargers 20–10. **Drive: 8 plays, 60 yards, 4:30.**
- SDG – Chuck Muncie 3-yard run (Rolf Benirschke kick), 0:19. Chargers 27–10. **Drive: 9 plays, 64 yards, 3:46.**

**Third quarter**

- SDG – Eric Sievers 1-yard pass from Dan Fouts (Rolf Benirschke kick), 1:07. Chargers 34–10. **Drive: 6 plays, 15 yards, 2:09.**

**Fourth quarter**

- DEN – Haven Moses 10-yard pass from Steve DeBerg (Fred Steinfort kick), 0:10. Chargers 34–17. **Drive: 4 plays, 69 yards, 1:08.**

**Top passers**

- DEN – Craig Morton – 19/31, 270 yards, 2 INT
- SDG – Dan Fouts – 19/29, 256 yards, TD

**Top rushers**

- DEN – Rick Parros – 5 rushes, 36 yards
- SDG – Chuck Muncie – 18 rushes, 75 yards, 4 TD

**Top receivers**

- DEN – Steve Watson – 4 receptions, 95 yards
- SDG – Wes Chandler – 4 receptions, 111 yards

Chandler had a 29-yard catch on the game's first play; later in that drive, Winslow's 22-yard catch took the ball to the Denver 14-yard line and Muncie scored on the next play. After Woodcock sacked Morton to force a three-and-out, San Diego drove for another quick touchdown, Chandler's 44-yard catch setting up Muncie's 1-yard run. San Diego had faced a 3rd down in neither of their first two drives. Denver's next drive ended with a Buchanon interception, but their next resulted in a touchdown early in the 2nd quarter. Later, Henderson recovered a fumbled punt at the Denver 13-yard line, setting up Muncie's third touchdown. Morton converted a 3rd and 13 with a 38-yard pass to the San Diego 6, but Denver settled for a field goal after Lowe's 3rd-down tackle at his own 3-yard line. The Chargers used up most of the final four minutes on their fourth touchdown drive; Fouts converted a 3rd and 12 with a 23-yard pass to Scales and Muncie's fourth touchdown came with 19 seconds left. San Diego were up 27–10 at halftime.

Denver had an early scoring chance in the second half, but Jim Laslavic recovered a fumble at his own 26-yard line and ran it back to the Broncos' 36. San Diego failed to capitalise on the opportunity when Winslow fumbled a fake field goal try. Later in the 3rd quarter, Lowe intercepted Morton at the Denver 15-yard line. The Chargers reached 4th and goal at the 1-yard line and scored on Fouts' pass to Sievers. The next Denver drive reached Chargers territory before being stopped by Lowe's 4th-down sack, and the Broncos didn't score again until the final seconds.

Muncie became the second Charger to run for four touchdowns in a game, following Clarence Williams two seasons earlier. He was injured early in the 3rd quarter and rushed only twice after halftime. This result left the three AFC West contenders tied once more, this time at 8–5. San Diego's favourable tiebreakers meant they would be assured of the division title with three more wins.

==== Week 14: vs. Buffalo Bills ====
Week Fourteen: Buffalo Bills at San Diego Chargers – Game summary

Quarter	1	2	3	4	Total
**Bills**	7	7	14	0	**28**
Chargers	7	14	3	3	**27**

at Jack Murphy Stadium, San Diego, California

- Date: December 6
- Game time: 1:00 p.m. PST
- Game weather: 59 °F (15 °C), relative humidity 81%, wind 9 miles per hour (14 km/h; 7.8 kn)
- Game attendance: 51,488
- Referee: Fred Wyant
- TV announcers (NBC): Dick Enberg & Merlin Olsen
- Box score

Game information

**First quarter**

- SDG – Chuck Muncie 9-yard run (Rolf Benirschke kick), 11:38. Chargers 7–0. **Drive: 7 plays, 46 yards, 1:36.**
- BUF – Joe Ferguson 3-yard run (Nick Mike-Mayer kick), 1:54. Tied 7–7. **Drive: 5 plays, 25 yards, 2:15.**

**Second quarter**

- SDG – Wes Chandler 17-yard pass from Dan Fouts (Rolf Benirschke kick), 11:18. Chargers 14–7. **Drive: 10 plays, 82 yards, 5:36.**
- BUF – Roosevelt Leaks 9-yard run (Nick Mike-Mayer kick), 8:36. Tied 14–14. **Drive: 5 plays, 66 yards, 2:42.**
- SDG – Kellen Winslow 67-yard pass from Dan Fouts (Rolf Benirschke kick), 0:55. Chargers 21–14. **Drive: 3 plays, 87 yards, 0:45.**

**Third quarter**

- BUF – Roosevelt Leaks 1-yard run (Nick Mike-Mayer kick), 11:06. Tied 21–21. **Drive: 6 plays, 67 yards, 2:46.**
- SDG – Rolf Benirschke 29-yard field goal, 7:45. Chargers 24–21. **Drive: 7 plays, 57 yards, 3:21.**
- BUF – Joe Cribbs 1-yard run (Nick Mike-Mayer kick), 3:37. Bills 28–24. **Drive: 9 plays, 68 yards, 4:08.**

**Fourth quarter**

- SDG – Rolf Benirschke 27-yard field goal, 14:11. Bills 28–27. **Drive: 9 plays, 56 yards, 4:26.**

**Top passers**

- BUF – Joe Ferguson – 13/29, 248 yards
- SDG – Dan Fouts – 28/42, 343 yards, 2 TD, INT

**Top rushers**

- BUF – Joe Cribbs – 14 rushes, 35 yards, TD
- SDG – Chuck Muncie – 22 rushes, 119 yards, TD

**Top receivers**

- BUF – Frank Lewis – 5 receptions, 113 yards
- SDG – Kellen Winslow – 6 receptions, 126 yards, TD

San Diego's defense opened the game by forcing a three-and-out; the Bills' punt went only 19 yards to the Buffalo 46. Muncie ran for 16 yards on a 3rd and 1, and finished the drive with his NFL-record-tying 19th rushing touchdown of the year. San Diego reached the Buffalo 45-yard line later in the 1st quarter, but Mario Clark intercepted Fouts and returned the ball 53 yards to set up a Buffalo touchdown. San Diego responded with a 10-play, 83-yard drive. They appeared to be settling for a field goal on 4th and 3 from the Bills 22-yard line, but Buffalo jumped offside and Fouts found Chandler for the touchdown a play later. Buffalo needed only 5 plays to re-tie the score. A minute before halftime, Winslow caught a short pass on 2nd and 10 from the Chargers 33-yard line; he broke a tackle and raced up the left sideline to complete a 67-yard touchdown reception, putting San Diego up 21–14 at halftime.

Buffalo scored touchdowns on their first two drives of the 3rd quarter, either side of a Benirschke field goal. Trailing by four points, San Diego reached the Buffalo 2-yard line after Chandler drew a 29-yard pass interference penalty. Winslow committed a hold on 1st and goal, and they had to settle for another field goal. They forced a punt and reached 4th and 2 at the Buffalo 35, but Muncie was stopped for no gain. The Bills converted a 4th and 3 on their next drive, but eventually missed a field goal and left San Diego 4:30 to drive for the winning points. They picked up three first downs and reached the two minute warning facing a 2nd and 9 from the Buffalo 32. Muncie then burst through the middle but fumbled at the 26; the Bills recovered and gained a first down, enabling them to run the clock out.

This was a rematch from the previous season's divisional playoffs game, won by the Chargers in the same venue. Fouts had 260 of his 343 passing yards in the first half. The Chargers had a pair of 100-yard receivers—Winslow had 6 catches for 126 yards and a touchdown; Joiner had 7 catches for 106 yards. Winslow's touchdown was the longest of his career. San Diego outgained Buffalo 482–318, but committed both the game's turnovers. At the same, Denver were beating Kansas City 16–13 to move into sole possession of first place in the AFC West.

This was the last time the Chargers ever lost to the Bills in San Diego. Buffalo's next road win over the Chargers came in 2023, by which time they had moved back to Los Angeles.

==== Week 15: at Tampa Bay Buccaneers ====
Week Fifteen: San Diego Chargers at Tampa Bay Buccaneers – Game summary

Quarter	1	2	3	4	Total
**Chargers**	7	7	0	10	**24**
Buccaneers	7	0	3	13	**23**

at Tampa Stadium, Tampa, Florida

- Date: December 13
- Game time: 1:00 p.m. EST
- Game weather: 58 °F (14.4 °C), relative humidity 55%, wind 8 miles per hour (13 km/h; 7.0 kn)
- Game attendance: 67,388
- Referee: Gene Barth
- TV announcers (NBC): Phil Stone & Gene Washington
- Box score

Game information

**First quarter**

- SDG – Eric Sievers 27-yard pass from Dan Fouts (Rolf Benirschke kick), 9:03. Chargers 7–0. **Drive: 6 plays, 52 yards, 2:46.**
- TB – Theo Bell 58-yard pass from Doug Williams (Bill Capece kick), 7:03. Tied 7–7. **Drive: 5 plays, 73 yards, 1:49.**

**Second quarter**

- SDG – John Cappelletti 8-yard run (Rolf Benirschke kick), 7:32. Chargers 14–7. **Drive: 12 plays, 90 yards, 6:02.**

**Third quarter**

- TB – Bill Capece 49-yard field goal, 10:17. Chargers 14–10. **Drive: 10 plays, 41 yards, 4:31.**

**Fourth quarter**

- SDG – James Brooks 1-yard run (Rolf Benirschke kick), 11:52. Chargers 21–10. **Drive: 7 plays, 67 yards, 3:39.**
- TB – James Wilder 8-yard run (kick failed), 8:33. Chargers 21–16. **Drive: 6 plays, 80 yards, 3:13.**
- TB – James Wilder 23-yard run (Bill Capece kick), 8:06. Buccaneers 23–21. **Drive: 1 play, 23 yards, 0:06.**
- SDG – Rolf Benirschke 29-yard field goal, 0:25. Chargers 24–23. **Drive: 16 plays, 60 yards, 4:53.**

**Top passers**

- SDG – Dan Fouts – 33/49, 351 yards, TD, 2 INT
- TB – Doug Williams – 22/35, 321 yards, TD, 2 INT

**Top rushers**

- SDG – John Cappelletti – 9 rushes, 32 yards, TD
- TB – James Owen – 11 rushes, 61 yards

**Top receivers**

- SDG – Wes Chandler – 8 receptions, 112 yards
- TB – Theo Bell – 3 receptions, 96 yards, TD

San Diego opened the scoring on their second possession. Fouts and Joiner combined for 9 yards on a 3rd and 8 from midfield, Muncie ran for 14 yards and Sievers scored two plays later. with Fouts finding Sievers over the middle for 27 yards and a touchdown. Tampa Bay responded quickly: Theo Bell took in a short pass from Doug Williams and went 58 yards to tie the score. In the 2nd quarter, Fouts completed all seven of his passes on the drive to Cappelletti's touchdown—the completions covered 81 yards and included two third down conversions. The next Chargers drive covered 82 yards in 17 plays, but ended with Fouts throwing an end zone interception on 3rd and 10 from the Buccaneers 15-yard line. San Diego led 14-7 at halftime.

Tampa Bay kicked a field goal early in the third quarter. Brooks fumbled the ball in Buccaneers territory but Lowe soon made a recovery inside his own 40-yard line. Fouts opened the next drive with consecutive completions of 22 yards and 20 yards; the Chargers progressed to Brooks' 1-yard touchdown. The Buccaneers responded with two touchdowns in the space of 27 seconds. First, James Wilder scored (though the extra point was missed). Two plays later, Fouts was intercepted, setting the Buccaneers up at the San Diego 23. From there, Wilder ran in the go-ahead score. Cappelletti fumbled and Tampa Bay took over at the Chargers 36-yard line with 6:28 on the clock. Two plays later, Edwards hit Williams' intended receiver, causing the ball to pop up for Lowe to intercept. Starting at his own 29-yard line, Fouts moved the Chargers to a 4th and 1 from the Tampa Bay 34. They opted to go for it, and converted via Winslow's 3-yard catch. The tight end also converted a 3rd and 6 before Benirschke hit the game-winner with 45 seconds on the clock. Williams moved the ball to the Tampa 37, from where his final pass was intercepted by Edwards inside the 10-yard line as time expired.

The two teams combined for 849 yards (445 for San Diego, 404 for Tampa Bay) and seven turnovers (four by San Diego, three by Tampa Bay). Elsewhere, the Chiefs lost and were eliminated from the playoff race, but Denver beat the Seahawks to remain in first place. To qualify for the playoffs, San Diego would need either the Jets or Broncos to slip up, then win their final game against Oakland.

==== Week 16: vs. Oakland Raiders ====
Week Sixteen: Oakland Raiders at San Diego Chargers – Game summary

Quarter	1	2	3	4	Total
Raiders	0	3	7	0	**10**
**Chargers**	7	10	3	3	**23**

at Jack Murphy Stadium, San Diego, California

- Date: December 21
- Game time: 6:00 p.m. PST
- Game weather: 63 °F (17.2 °C), relative humidity 74%, wind 13 miles per hour (21 km/h; 11 kn)
- Game attendance: 52,279
- Referee: Jerry Seeman
- TV announcers (ABC): Frank Gifford, Don Meredith & Howard Cosell
- Box score

Game information

**First quarter**

- SDG – James Brooks 28-yard run (Rolf Benirschke kick), 6:43. Chargers 7–0. **Drive: 3 plays, 68 yards, 1:45.**

**Second quarter**

- OAK – Chris Bahr 34-yard field goal, 14:51. Chargers 7–3. **Drive: 15 plays, 62 yards, 6:43.**
- SDG – Rolf Benirschke 24-yard field goal, 9:19. Chargers 10–3. **Drive: 11 plays, 77 yards, 5:32.**
- SDG – Charlie Joiner 29-yard pass from Dan Fouts (Rolf Benirschke kick), 1:05. Chargers 17–3. **Drive: 2 plays, 35 yards, 0:30.**

**Third quarter**

- OAK – Mark van Eeghen 1-yard run (Chris Bahr kick), 8:08. Chargers 17–10. **Drive: 15 plays, 71 yards, 6:52.**
- SDG – Rolf Benirschke 27-yard field goal, 1:42. Chargers 20–10. **Drive: 12 plays, 56 yards, 6:26.**

**Fourth quarter**

- SDG – Rolf Benirschke 39-yard field goal, 3:46. Chargers 23–10. **Drive: 15 plays, 62 yards, 7:37.**

**Top passers**

- OAK – Marc Wilson – 12/34, 248 yards, INT
- SDG – Dan Fouts – 14/27, 222 yards, TD

**Top rushers**

- OAK – Marc Wilson – 4 rushes, 31 yards
- SDG – Chuck Muncie – 28 rushes, 94 yards

**Top receivers**

- OAK – Bob Chandler – 6 receptions, 128 yards
- SDG – Charlie Joiner – 6 receptions, 94 yards, TD

The day before this game, Denver were beaten 35–24 by the Chicago Bears. As a result, San Diego had the opportunity to reached the playoffs as the AFC West champions; defeat would mean elimination.

Midway through the 1st quarter, Shaw and Buchanon forced a fumble that Edwards recovered at the Chargers 32-yard line. Fouts completions on the next two plays moved the ball 29 and 11 yards, and Brooks finished off the rapid scoring drive with a 28–yard run up the middle. The Raiders converted four 3rd downs on their next drive, eventually settling for a field goal. Fouts responded with completions of 32 yards to Sievers and 21 yards to Joiner as the Chargers moved into position for Benirschke's short field goal. Later, San Diego were fortunate when George Roberts had a punt blocked only for Laslavic to scoop up the ball and make first down yardage at the Chargers 32-yard line. San Diego eventually had to punt again; Buchanon intercepted Marc Wilson on the ensuing drive, and Fouts found Joiner for a 29-yard touchdown two plays later. Wilson drove Oakland to a 2nd and 10 from the Chargers 11-yard line with sevens seconds left before halftime, but he spent too long while throwing an incompletion and time expired with the Chargers ahead 17–3.

Oakland opened the 3rd quarter by again converting four 3rd downs, this time finishing with a touchdown; the Chargers replied with Benirschke's second field goal. The Raiders reached a 3rd and 11 at the San Diego 44-yard line in the final quarter before a Leroy Jones sack forced them to punt. San Diego ran over seven minutes off the clock on the next drive. Fouts converted a 3rd and 18 with a 19-yard pass to Chandler, and only 3:46 remained when Benirschke kicked his final field goal. Oakland gained a single first down on their next drive before turning the ball over on downs. San Diego tried to get Muncie a record-breaking 20th rushing touchdown in the final seconds, but he was stuffed on 4th and goal from the 2.

It was the third consecutive season in which the Chargers clinched their division by winning the final Monday night game of the season. They swept the season series with the Raiders, beating them in both games for the first time since the 1965 season.

== Standings ==
AFC West
	W	L	T	PCT	DIV	CONF	PF	PA	STK
^{(3)} San Diego Chargers	10	6	0	.625	6–2	8–4	478	390	W2
Denver Broncos	10	6	0	.625	5–3	7–5	321	289	L1
Kansas City Chiefs	9	7	0	.563	5–3	7–5	343	290	W1
Oakland Raiders	7	9	0	.438	2–6	5–7	273	343	L2
Seattle Seahawks	6	10	0	.375	2–6	6–8	322	388	W1

== Postseason ==
Round	Date	Opponent (seed)	Result	Record	Venue	Attendance	Recap
Divisional	January 2, 1982	at Miami Dolphins (2)	W 41–38 (OT)	1–0	Miami Orange Bowl	73,735	Recap
AFC Championship	January 10, 1982	at Cincinnati Bengals (1)	L 7–27	1–1	Riverfront Stadium	46,302	Recap

=== Game summaries ===
==== AFC Divisional Playoffs: at Dolphins ====
AFC Divisional Playoffs: (#3) San Diego Chargers at (#2) Miami Dolphins – Game summary

Quarter	1	2	3	4	OT	Total
Chargers	24	0	7	7	3	41
Dolphins	0	17	14	7	0	38

at Miami Orange Bowl, Miami, Florida

- Date: January 2
- Game time: 5:00 p.m. EST
- Game weather: 76 °F (24.4 °C), clear
- Game attendance: 73,735
- Referee: Fred Wyant
- TV announcers (NBC): Don Criqui and John Brodie
- Box score

Game information

First quarter

- SDG – Rolf Benirschke 32-yard field goal, 9:49. Chargers 3–0. Drive: 9 plays, 64 yards, 5:11.
- SDG – Wes Chandler 58-yard punt return (Rolf Benirschke kick), 7:24. Chargers 10–0.
- SDG – Chuck Muncie 1-yard run (Rolf Benirschke kick), 3:58. Chargers 17–0. Drive: 7 plays, 29 yards, 3:16.
- SDG – James Brooks 8-yard pass from Dan Fouts (Rolf Benirschke kick), 1:31. Chargers 24–0. Drive: 3 plays, 11 yards, 0:48.

Second quarter

- MIA – Uwe von Schamann 34-yard field goal, 8:31. Chargers 24–3. Drive: 10 plays, 63 yards, 3:34.
- MIA – Joe Rose 1-yard pass from Don Strock (Uwe von Schamann kick), 2:45. Chargers 24–10. Drive: 7 plays, 39 yards, 3:59.
- MIA – Tony Nathan 25-yard lateral from Duriel Harris after 15-yard pass from Don Strock (Uwe von Schamann kick), 0:00. Chargers 24–17. Drive: 4 plays, 63 yards, 0:30.

Third quarter

- MIA – Joe Rose 15-yard pass from Don Strock (Uwe von Schamann kick), 10:50. Tied 24–24. Drive: 8 plays, 74 yards, 4:10.
- SDG – Kellen Winslow 25-yard pass from Dan Fouts (Rolf Benirschke kick), 4:15. Chargers 31–24. Drive: 6 plays, 60 yards, 2:24.
- MIA – Bruce Hardy 50-yard pass from Don Strock (Uwe von Schamann kick), 1:28. Tied 31–31. Drive: 6 plays, 83 yards, 2:47.

Fourth quarter

- MIA – Tony Nathan 12-yard run (Uwe von Schamann kick), 14:53. Dolphins 38–31. Drive: 2 plays, 15 yards, 0:54.
- SDG – James Brooks 9-yard pass from Dan Fouts (Rolf Benirschke kick), 0:58. Tied 38–38. Drive: 10 plays, 82 yards, 3:41.

Overtime

- SDG – Rolf Benirschke 29-yard field goal, 1:08. Chargers 41–38. Drive: 6 plays, 74 yards, 2:25.

Top passers

- SDG – Dan Fouts – 33/53, 433 yards, 3 TD, INT
- TB – Don Strock – 29/43, 403 yards, 4 TD, INT

Top rushers

- SDG – Chuck Muncie – 24 rushes, 120 yards, TD
- TB – Tony Nathan – 14 rushes, 48 yards, TD

Top receivers

- SDG – Kellen Winslow – 13 receptions, 166 yards, TD
- TB – Tony Nathan – 9 receptions, 114 yards, TD

San Diego faced a 3rd and 14 at their own 30-yard line early in the game; Fouts connected with Chandler for 47 yards to convert, leading to a Benirschke field goal. The Dolphins went three-and-out after Jones's 3rd-down sack of David Woodley, and Chandler ran the punt back 56-yard for a touchdown. Benirschke hit the ensuing kickoff short, and the Dolphins failed to claim the ball—Hank Bauer recovered at the Miami 29-yard line. Fouts and Winslow combined for 8 yards to convert a 3rd and 2, and Muncie finished the drive with a 1-yard touchdown. Three plays later, Glen Edwards intercepted Woodley and ran the ball back 35 yards to the 11-yard line. Fouts found Brooks for the touchdown on 3rd and 7, and the Chargers led 24–0. Miami punted after Johnson sacked Woodley twice on the next drive. The Dolphins also forced a punt, and inserted backup Don Strock at quarterback. Strock immediately led Miami to a field goal, then added a touchdown seven plays after Fouts lost a fumble while being sacked in his own territory. Late in the half, Benirschke was wide right on a 55-yard field goal try, and Miami moved to the San Diego 40-yard line with six seconds left. From there, they executed a hook and ladder and scored a touchdown to trail only 24–17 at halftime.

The Dolphins tied the game by opening the 3rd quarter with their third consecutive touchdown drive. Winslow's 31-yard catch moved the ball to the Miami 31-yard line, but he was flagged for offensive pass interference on the next play and the Chargers eventually punted. After the Dolphins also punted, Fouts converted a 3rd and 10 with a 17-yard pass to Scales, then Winslow scored from 25 yards out. Miami re-tied the score on their next drive, then took their first lead two plays after Fouts was intercepted. The Dolphins forced a punt and ran seven minutes off the clock. On 2nd and 7 from the San Diego 21, Kelcher forced a fumble that Pete Shaw recovered at the 18-yard line. Fouts completed 7 of 8 passes for 75 yards on the game-tying drive; his final pass was aimed for Winslow but overthrown and caught by Brooks instead. Buchanon made a diving interception two plays later, but fumbled when he hit the ground and Miami recovered. They moved in range for Uwe von Schamann to try a 43-yard field goal, which was tipped by Winslow and fell short as time expired. Tied at 38–38, the game went to overtime.

San Diego won the coin toss and reached a 3rd and 20 from their own 45-yard line, from where Winslow took a pass 21 yards to keep the drive going. Consecutive runs of 11 yards for Muncie and 14 yards for Brooks took the ball inside the Miami 10-yard line. After one further play, Benirschke's 27-yard attempt missed wide left. The Dolphins punted, then Muncie lost a fumble near midfield. After one more punt each, Miami got into range for another von Schamann kick, this one from 34 yard out. This time, Jones blocked the attempt. Fouts moved San Diego to their own 31-yard line, then threw consecutive completions of 20 yards to Chandler and 39 yards to Joiner to reach the Dolphins 10. On the next play, Benirschke hit the game winning 29-yard field goal.

Fouts set NFL playoff records (since surpassed) for pass attempts (53), completions (33), and yards (433). (Note: Bernie Kosar broke the attempts and yardage records in 1986 (64 attempts, 483 yards), and Warren Moon broke the completions record in 1992 (36 completions).) Winslow's 13 receptions set a new single-game playoff record, (Note: This record was tied by Thurman Thomas in 1989 and surpassed by Darren Sproles in 2011.) while his 166 yard total were a playoff record for tight ends. (Note: Vernon Davis broke this record with 180 yards thirty years later.) The Chargers had three 100-yard receivers in total, as Joiner caught 7 passes for 108 yards while Joiner caught 6 for 106. Muncie had 120 yards rushing and another 5 receiving. Brooks had 143 all-purpose yards: 19 rushing, 31 receiving, 85 on kickoff returns, 8 on punt returns. The Chargers advanced to the AFC Championship for the second straight year.

This was the last time the Chargers beat the Dolphins in Miami until 2019.

==== AFC Conference Championships: at Bengals ====
AFC Divisional Playoffs: (#3) San Diego Chargers at (#1) Cincinnati Bengals – Game summary

Quarter	1	2	3	4	Total
Chargers	0	7	0	0	7
Bengals	10	7	3	7	27

at Riverfront Stadium, Cincinnati, Ohio

- Date: January 10
- Game time: 1:00 p.m. EST
- Game weather: −9 °F (−22.8 °C), sunny, windy
- Game attendance: 46,302
- Referee: Fred Silva
- TV announcers (NBC): Dick Enberg and Merlin Olsen
- Box score

Game information

First quarter

- CIN – Jim Breech 31-yard field goal, 8:05. Bengals 3–0. Drive: 10 plays, 51 yards, 5:02.
- CIN – M. L. Harris 8 yard pass from Ken Anderson (Jim Breech kick), 7:06. Bengals 10–0. Drive: 2 plays, 12 yards, 0:44.

Second quarter

- SDG – Kellen Winslow 33-yard pass from Dan Fouts (Rolf Benirschke kick), 13:34. Bengals 10–7. Drive: 6 plays, 55 yards, 2:58.
- CIN – Pete Johnson 1-yard run (Jim Breech kick), 9:57. Bengals 17–7. Drive: 7 plays, 55 yards, 3:37.

Third quarter

- CIN – Jim Breech 38-yard field goal, 9:49. Bengals 20–7. Drive: 8 plays, 39 yards, 4:18.

Fourth quarter

- CIN – Don Bass 3-yard pass from Ken Anderson (Jim Breech kick), 6:52. Bengals 27–7. Drive: 14 plays, 68 yards, 8:04.

Top passers

- SDG – Dan Fouts – 15/28, 185 yards, TD, 2 INT
- CIN – Ken Anderson – 14/22, 161 yards, 2 TD

Top rushers

- SDG – Chuck Muncie – 23 rushes, 94 yards
- CIN – Pete Johnson – 21 rushes, 80 yards, TD

Top receivers

- SDG – Wes Chandler – 6 receptions, 79 yards
- CIN – Dan Ross – 5 receptions, 69 yards

After the Bengals scored a field goal on their first possession, Brooks fumbled the ensuing kickoff. Cincinnati recovered at the San Diego 12-yard line, and scored again two plays later. Chandler's 22-yard catch converted a 3rd and 9 on a drive that reached the Cincinnati 19 before Benirschke was short on a 37-yard field goal attempt. The Chargers forced a punt, and Muncie ran for just enough yardage on a 3rd and 3 as they moved from their own 45-yard line to the Cincinnati 33. From there, Winslow took a Fouts pass up the right sideline for a touchdown. The Bengals responded with a 40-yard kickoff return and 55-yard touchdown drive. San Diego drove to the Bengals 33-yard line and their 21-yard line on their next two drives, but Fouts was intercepted both times and the score remained 17–7 at halftime.

Chandler's 18-yard catch took the Chargers to the Cincinnati 38 on the first drive of the second half, but Muncie lost a fumble on the next play. The Bengals drove 39 yards the other way and added a field goal. The next Cincinnati drive reached the Chargers 16-yard line before Buchanon stopped it with a fumble recovery. Joiner caught a 21-yard pass on the next play, and San Diego drove as far as the Bengals 25-yard line. Fouts was sacked on 3rd down, and Benirschke's 50-yard field goal try was short. Cincinnati drove to their final touchdown, and the final San Diego drive ended when Brooks was tackled at the Bengals 4-yard line on a 4th and goal with two minutes.

San Diego had their least passing yards (173) and total yards (301) in any game that season. Their passing offense was neutralized by frigid conditions and strong winds. Chargers lost and in 1982 in the strike shortened finished 6-3. Win to the Steelers 31-28 in the Wild Card. But lost to the Dolphins the rival of the Epic in Miami 34-13.

== Awards ==
Five Chargers were named to the 1982 Pro Bowl, and three were named first or second team Associated Press (AP) All-Pros. Fouts, Muncie and Winslow were amongst the runners-up for AP NFL Most Valuable Player with 1 vote each, while for the AP NFL Offensive Player of the Year the same three players received 3, 2 and 1 vote(s) respectively.

Player	Position	Pro Bowl starter	Pro Bowl reserve	AP 1st team All-Pro	AP 2nd team All-Pro
Dan Fouts	Quarterback		Yes		
Louie Kelcher	Defensive tackle				Yes
Gary Johnson	Defensive tackle	Yes		Yes	
Chuck Muncie	Running back		Yes		
Doug Wilkerson	Guard	Yes			
Kellen Winslow	Tight end	Yes		Yes	
