= 1981 Chicago Bears season =

NFL team season

- Owner: George Halas
- General manager: Jim Finks
- Head coach: Neill Armstrong
- Home stadium: Soldier Field

Results
- Record: 6–10
- Division place: 5th NFC Central
- Playoffs: Did not qualify

The 1981 season was the Chicago Bears' 62nd in the National Football League, and their fourth under head coach Neill Armstrong. The team failed to improve on their 7–9 record from 1980 to finish at 6–10, and failed to make the playoffs for the second consecutive season. At the end of the season, Neill Armstrong was fired by the Bears.

One unusual sidelight to the season was that of the Bears' 6 victories, 4 of them were against opponents in the AFC West; including a 20–17 upset of San Diego in week 8 and a 35–24 victory that eliminated the Broncos from playoff contention on the final week of the regular season.

== 1981 NFL draft ==
1981 Chicago Bears draft
Round	Pick	Player	Position	College	Notes
1	11	Keith Van Horne	Offensive tackle	USC	
2	38	Mike Singletary * ^{†}	Linebacker	Baylor	
3	67	Ken Margerum	Wide receiver	Stanford	
4	65	Todd Bell *	Safety	Ohio State	
6	150	Reuben Henderson	Cornerback	San Diego State	
7	177	Jeff Fisher	Cornerback	USC	
8	205	Scott Zettek	Wide receiver	Notre Dame	
9	232	Frank Ditta	Offensive guard	Baylor	
10	260	Tim Clifford	Quarterback	Indiana	
11	287	Lonnie Johnson	Running back	Indiana	
12	316	Bob Shupryt	Linebacker	New Mexico	
Made roster † Pro Football Hall of Fame * Made at least one Pro Bowl during career

=== Free Agent Signings ===
After the draft, the Bears signed multiple undrafted free agents, 3 of whom made the team when preseason ended: Tulane wide receiver Marcus Anderson, Alcorn State cornerback Leslie Frazier and Iowa center Jay Hilgenberg.

1981 undrafted free agents of note
Player	Position	College
Scott McGhee	Wide receiver	Eastern Illinois
Todd Sheets	Wide receiver	Northwestern

== Roster ==
1981 Chicago Bears roster
Quarterbacks (QB): 7 Bob Avellini; 8 Vince Evans; Running backs (RB): 35 Roland Harper; 37 Willie McClendon; 34 Walter Payton; 30 John Skibinski; 26 Matt Suhey; Wide receivers (WR): 88 Marcus Anderson; 84 Brian Baschnagel; 89 Ken Margerum; 43 Emery Moorehead; 80 Rickey Watts; Tight ends (TE): 87 Mike Cobb; 81 Robin Earl; 85 Bob Fisher; 83 Brooks Williams	Offensive linemen (OL): 64 Ted Albrecht T; 63 Jay Hilgenberg C; 65 Noah Jackson G; 62 Dan Jiggetts T; 52 Dan Neal C; 69 Revie Sorey G; 78 Keith Van Horne T; 79 Emanuel Zanders G; Defensive linemen (DL): 99 Dan Hampton DE; 90 Al Harris DE; 73 Mike Hartenstine DE; 76 Steve McMichael DT; 68 Jim Osborne DT; 82 Alan Page DT	Linebackers (LB): 59 Gary Campbell OLB; 54 Brian Cabral OLB; 51 Bruce Herron OLB; 57 Lee Kunz MLB; 50 Mike Singletary MLB; 55 Otis Wilson OLB; Defensive backs (DB): 25 Todd Bell SS; 45 Gary Fencik SS; 24 Jeff Fisher CB; 21 Leslie Frazier CB; 20 Reuben Henderson CB; 46 Doug Plank FS; 44 Terry Schmidt CB; Special teams (ST): 86 Bob Parsons P; 9 John Roveto K	Reserve: 14 Tim Clifford QB (IR); 97 T. K. Ehlebracht WR (IR); 82 Kris Haines WR (IR); 70 Dennis Lick T (IR); 58 Jerry Muckensturm LB (IR); 15 Mike Phipps QB (IR); 72 Brad Shearer DT (IR); 91 Todd Sheets WR (IR); 53 Paul Tabor G (IR); 16 Bob Thomas K (IR); 23 Len Walterscheid S (IR); 22 Dave Williams RB (IR); Rookies in italics

== Schedule ==
Week	Date	Opponent	Result	Record	Venue	Attendance
1	September 6	**Green Bay Packers**	**L** 9–16	0–1	Soldier Field	62,411
2	September 13	at San Francisco 49ers	**L** 17–28	0–2	Candlestick Park	49,520
3	September 20	**Tampa Bay Buccaneers**	**W** 28–17	1–2	Soldier Field	60,130
4	September 28	Los Angeles Rams	**L** 7–24	1–3	Soldier Field	62,461
5	October 4	at **Minnesota Vikings**	**L** 21–24	1–4	Metropolitan Stadium	43,827
6	October 11	Washington Redskins	**L** 7–24	1–5	Soldier Field	57,683
7	October 19	at **Detroit Lions**	**L** 17–48	1–6	Pontiac Silverdome	71,273
8	October 25	San Diego Chargers	**W** 20–17 (OT)	2–6	Soldier Field	52,906
9	November 1	at **Tampa Bay Buccaneers**	**L** 10–20	2–7	Tampa Stadium	63,688
10	November 8	at Kansas City Chiefs	**W** 16–13 (OT)	3–7	Arrowhead Stadium	60,605
11	November 15	at **Green Bay Packers**	**L** 17–21	3–8	Lambeau Field	55,338
12	November 22	**Detroit Lions**	**L** 7–23	3–9	Soldier Field	50,082
13	November 26	at Dallas Cowboys	**L** 9–10	3–10	Texas Stadium	63,499
14	December 6	**Minnesota Vikings**	**W** 10–9	4–10	Soldier Field	50,766
15	December 13	at Oakland Raiders	**W** 23–6	5–10	Oakland–Alameda County Coliseum	40,384
16	December 20	Denver Broncos	**W** 35–24	6–10	Soldier Field	40,125
Note: Intra-division opponents are in **bold** text.

== Game summaries ==
=== Week 3 ===
Team	1	2	3	4	Total
Buccaneers	7	0	7	3	17
• Bears	0	14	7	7	28

- Date: September 20
- Location: Soldier Field, Chicago, IL
- Game start: 2:00 p.m. EST
- Game weather: 58 °F (14 °C); wind 8 mph (13 km/h)

Scoring summary
Q1	TB	Washington 29 yard interception return (Yepremian kick)	TB 7–0
Q2	CHI	Suhey 1 yard run (Nielsen kick)	Tie 7–7
Q2	CHI	Fisher 88 yard interception return (Nielsen kick)	CHI 14–7
Q3	TB	House 11 yard pass from Williams (Yepremian kick)	Tie 14–14
Q3	CHI	Evans 8 yard run (Nielsen kick)	CHI 21–14
Q4	TB	Yepremian 32 yard field goal	CHI 21–17
Q4	CHI	Williams 18 yard pass from Evans (Nielsen kick)	CHI 28–17

=== Week 8 ===
Team	1	2	3	4	OT	Total
Chargers	0	3	0	14	0	17
• Bears	7	3	0	7	3	20

- Date: October 25
- Location: Soldier Field, Chicago, IL
- Game start: 4:00 p.m.
- Game weather: 39 °F (4 °C); wind 9 mph (14 km/h)
- Referee: Gordon McCarter
- Television network: NBC

Scoring summary
Q1	CHI	Suhey 7 yard run (Roveto kick)	CHI 7–0
Q2	SD	Benirschke 18 yard field goal	CHI 7–3
Q2	CHI	Roveto 31 yard field goal	CHI 10–3
Q4	SD	Joiner 22 yard pass from Fouts (Benirschke kick)	Tie 10–10
Q4	CHI	Payton 2 yard run (Roveto kick)	CHI 17–10
Q4	SD	Chandler 39 yard pass from Fouts (Benirschke kick)	Tie 17–17
OT	CHI	Roveto 26 yard field goal	CHI 20–17

=== Week 15 ===
Chicago Bears (4–10) at Oakland Raiders (7–7)

Quarter	1	2	3	4	Total
Bears	7	0	14	2	23
Raiders	6	0	0	0	6

at Oakland-Alameda County Coliseum • Oakland, California

- Date: December 13
- Game time: 4:00 p.m.
- Game weather: 56 °F (13 °C); wind 7 mph (11 km/h)
- Referee: Fred Silva
- TV: CBS
- Pro-Football-Reference.com

Game information

Bears

- Vince Evans
  15/32, 240 Yds, 3 TD, INT
- Roland Harper
  15 Rush, 49 Yds
- Rickey Watts
  5 Rec, 90 Yds, 2 TD

Raiders

- Marc Wilson
  17/38, 240 Yds, TD, INT
- Arthur Whittington
  9 Rush, 32 Yds
- Bob Chandler
  4 Rec, 73 Yds, TD

Scoring summary

Quarter	Time	Drive			Team	Scoring information	Score	
Quarter	Time	Plays	Yards	TOP	Team	Scoring information	CHI	OAK
1					Bears	Watts 42-yard touchdown reception from Evans, Roveto kick good	7	0
1					Raiders	Chandler 27-yard touchdown reception from Wilson, Bahr kick no good	7	6
3					Bears	Watts 3-yard touchdown reception from Evans, Roveto kick good	14	6
3					Bears	Margerum 22-yard touchdown reception from Evans, Roveto kick good	21	6
4					Bears	Wilson tackled in end zone for a safety by Plank	23	6
"TOP" = time of possession. For other American football terms, see Glossary of American football.							23	6

=== Week 16 ===
Team	1	2	3	4	Total
Broncos	3	0	14	7	24
• Bears	0	14	14	7	35

- Date: December 20
- Location: Soldier Field, Chicago, Illinois
- Game start: 12:00 p.m.
- Game weather: 6 °F (−14 °C), wind 11 mph (18 km/h)
- Referee: Gordon McCarter
- TV announcers (NBC): Bob Costas and Bob Trumpy

Scoring summary
1	DEN	Fred Steinfort 46 yard field goal	Broncos 3–0
2	CHI	Walter Payton 19 yard pass from Vince Evans (John Roveto kick)	Bears 7–3
2	CHI	Roland Harper 4 yard run (John Roveto kick)	Bears 14–3
3	CHI	Gary Fencik 69 yard interception return (John Roveto kick)	Bears 21–3
3	DEN	Riley Odoms 6 yard pass from Craig Morton (Fred Steinfort kick)	Bears 21–10
3	CHI	Al Harris 44 yard interception return (John Roveto kick)	Bears 28–10
3	DEN	Rick Upchurch 25 yard pass from Steve DeBerg (Fred Steinfort kick)	Bears 28–17
4	CHI	Walter Payton 7 yard pass from Vince Evans (John Roveto kick)	Bears 35–17
4	DEN	Rick Upchurch 39 yard pass from Steve DeBerg (Fred Steinfort kick)	Bears 35–24

== Standings ==
NFC Central
	W	L	T	PCT	DIV	CONF	PF	PA	STK
Tampa Bay Buccaneers^{(3)}	9	7	0	.563	6–2	9–3	315	268	W1
Detroit Lions	8	8	0	.500	4–4	6–6	397	322	L1
Green Bay Packers	8	8	0	.500	4–4	7–7	324	361	L1
Minnesota Vikings	7	9	0	.438	4–4	6–6	325	369	L5
Chicago Bears	6	10	0	.375	2–6	2–10	253	324	W3
