= Eric Sievers =

American professional football player (1957–2024)

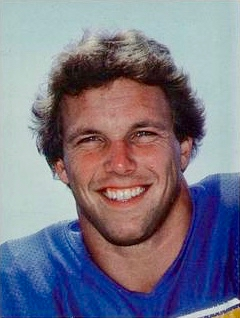
- Sievers with the San Diego Chargers c. 1982

No. 85, 82
- Position: Tight end

Personal information
- Born: November 9, 1957; Urbana, Illinois, U.S.
- Died: April 10, 2024 (aged 66)
- Listed height: 6 ft 4 in (1.93 m)
- Listed weight: 236 lb (107 kg)

Career information
- High school: Washington-Lee (Arlington, Virginia)
- College: Maryland
- NFL draft: 1981: 4th round, 107th overall pick

Career history
- San Diego Chargers (1981–1988); Los Angeles Rams (1988); New England Patriots (1989–1990); Miami Dolphins (1991)*
- * Offseason or practice squad member only

Career NFL statistics
- Receptions: 214
- Receiving yards: 2,485
- Receiving touchdowns: 16
- Stats at Pro Football Reference

Eric Scott Sievers (November 9, 1957 – April 10, 2024) was an American professional football player who was a tight end for 10 seasons in the National Football League (NFL), primarily with the San Diego Chargers. He played college football for the Maryland Terrapins before being selected by the Chargers in the fourth round of the 1981 NFL draft. Sievers was named to the NFL All-Rookie team in 1981. He played in the NFL from 1981 to 1990 for the Chargers, Los Angeles Rams and New England Patriots.

== Early life and college ==
Born in Urbana, Illinois, on November 9, 1957, Sievers grew up in Arlington, Virginia. He attended Washington-Lee High School (now Washington-Liberty High School) in Arlington, where he was a three-sport athlete in football, basketball and track. As a senior in 1975, Sievers earned All-American honors in football from Parade and Scholastic Magazine. He was inducted into the Virginia High School Hall of Fame in 1997.

At the University of Maryland, College Park, Sievers established himself as a strong blocker, but he did not catch the ball much as the Terrapins did not pass often.

== Professional career ==
Sievers was selected by the San Diego Chargers in the fourth round of the 1981 NFL draft with the 107th overall pick. They also drafted tight end Pete Holohan in the seventh round, who was Sievers's roommate at the East–West Shrine Game, where they became friends. In his first season in 1981, Sievers started 10 games while frequently replacing Kellen Winslow when the All-Pro tight end lined up outside as a wingback. United Press International named Sievers to their NFL All-Rookie team. In the postseason, the Chargers won their American Football Conference (AFC) divisional playoff game 41–38 in overtime over Miami. A four-hour contest played under hot and humid conditions, the game came to be known as the Epic in Miami and voted by the Pro Football Hall of Fame as the "NFL's Game of the '80s". The enduring image of the game is an exhausted Winslow, who had 13 catches for 166 yards and blocked a game-winning field goal attempt at the end of regulation, being carried off the field after the game by Sievers and teammate Billy Shields. The Chargers fell one game short of the Super Bowl, losing the following week's AFC Championship Game 27–7 to Cincinnati in the coldest playoff game in NFL history at −59 °F (−51 °C) wind chill, dubbed the "Freezer Bowl".

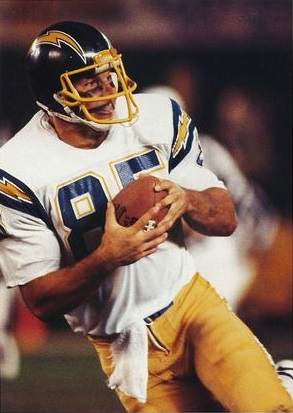
Sievers c. 1984

A solid blocker, Sievers was an integral part of Air Coryell, San Diego head coach Don Coryell's wide-open passing attack with quarterback Dan Fouts. His best receiving years with the Chargers were in 1984 and 1985, when he posted identical seasons of 41 catches for 438 yards. In 1984, Sievers, Holohan, and Winslow contributed to the Chargers' 164 receptions by the tight end position, setting an NFL single-season record for tight ends on a team. (Note: Holohan (56 catches), Winslow (55) and Sievers (41) combined for 152 receptions. Ron Egloff had 11, and Drew Gissinger, normally a tackle, had 1 playing tight end. The Associated Press wrote in 2005 that the 1984 Chargers' tight ends had 163 catches.) Sievers began the 1985 season with 30 receptions and five touchdowns in the first seven games, but had just 11 catches for one score in the final nine games after Winslow returned from his injury coupled with the offense's shift to get Lionel James and Gary Anderson more involved.

After catching 149 passes through his first five seasons, Sievers was limited by injuries and minimal playing time and had just three catches over the next three seasons. He played in only nine games and caught just two passes in 1986 while hampered by a compression fracture in his leg and underwent surgery in the offseason. In 1988, he was placed on injured reserve with a neck injury. According to Sievers, his injury was not severe enough to warrant the move. "It gave them an opening to bring in the people they really wanted to have", he said. San Diego tried to activate him by passing him through waivers, but he was claimed by the Los Angeles Rams. He had been the second-longest tenured player on the Chargers roster behind Don Macek. He played one regular-season and one playoff game at the end of the Rams' season before becoming a Plan B free agent.

Sievers signed with the New England Patriots in 1989. Although Lin Dawson started at tight end, Sievers led all AFC tight ends that year with 54 receptions for 615 yards, both career highs. In 1990, he injured his knee on November 4 against Philadelphia, and spent the remainder of the year on injured reserve. Sievers ended the season with eight catches for 77 yards in eight games with one start. He signed with the Miami Dolphins as a Plan B free agent in 1991, but was waived during preseason.

== Later life ==
In 1994, Sievers partnered with host Charlie Jones on Chargers: Monday Night Live, a weekly Monday Night Football postgame show on KGTV channel 10 in San Diego.

After a six-year battle with bladder cancer, Sievers died on April 10, 2024, at the age of 66.
