= Rickey Watts =

American football player (born 1957)

No. 80
- Position: Wide receiver

Personal information
- Born: May 16, 1957 (age 69); Longview, Texas, U.S.
- Listed height: 6 ft 1 in (1.85 m)
- Listed weight: 203 lb (92 kg)

Career information
- High school: Longview
- College: Tulsa
- NFL draft: 1979: 2nd round, 39th overall pick

Career history
- Chicago Bears (1979–1983)

Career NFL statistics
- Receptions: 81
- Receiving yards: 1547
- Touchdowns: 8
- Stats at Pro Football Reference

Rickey Ricardo Watts (born May 16, 1957) is an American former professional football player who was a wide receiver for five seasons with the Chicago Bears of the National Football League (NFL). He played college football for the Tulsa Golden Hurricane.
