= John Roveto =

American football player (born 1958)

No. 9, 4, 7
- Position: Placekicker

Personal information
- Born: February 20, 1958 (age 68); Fort Lauderdale, Florida, U.S.
- Listed height: 6 ft 0 in (1.83 m)
- Listed weight: 180 lb (82 kg)

Career information
- High school: Spring (TX)
- College: Louisiana
- NFL draft: 1980: undrafted

Career history
- Dallas Cowboys (1980)*; Tampa Bay Buccaneers (1981)*; Chicago Bears (1981–1982); Chicago Blitz (1983); New Jersey Generals (1983)
- * Offseason or practice squad member only

Career NFL statistics
- Field goals made: 14
- Field goal attempts: 31
- Field goal %: 45.2
- Longest field goal: 51
- Stats at Pro Football Reference

John Roveto (born February 20, 1958) is an American former professional football player who was a placekicker for the Chicago Bears of the National Football League (NFL) from 1981 to 1982. He played college football for the Louisiana Ragin' Cajuns. During his NFL career, he played in 18 games over two seasons with the Bears. He made just 45.2% of his field goals, missing 17 of 31 attempts over his career.

Ironically, Roveto was replaced in 1983 by the man he was hired to replace two seasons earlier, Bob Thomas.

== Poker ==
Roveto is an accomplished poker player who has earned more than $1.9 million in his career. His most notable finish was at the 2008 WPT World Championship, where he finished in third place and earned $923,355. In his final hand, Roveto went all-in pre-flop with pocket kings against eventual runner-up Gus Hansen, who had ace-10. Hansen completed a straight on the river to win the hand and eliminate Roveto.

Roveto most recently finished in the money at the 2024 WPT World Championship, finishing 139th and earning $29,500.
