= Irvin Phillips =

American football player (born 1960)

No. 23, 25
- Position: Defensive back

Personal information
- Born: January 23, 1960 (age 66); Leesburg, Florida, U.S.
- Listed height: 6 ft 1 in (1.85 m)
- Listed weight: 192 lb (87 kg)

Career information
- High school: Sarasota (FL)
- College: Arkansas Tech
- NFL draft: 1981: 3rd round, 77th overall pick

Career history
- San Diego Chargers (1981); Los Angeles Raiders (1983); Tampa Bay Buccaneers (1984)*
- * Offseason or practice squad member only

Awards and highlights
- Super Bowl champion (XVIII)

Career NFL statistics
- Fumble recoveries: 1
- Stats at Pro Football Reference

Irvin Jerome Phillips (born January 23, 1960) is an American former professional football player who was a defensive back in the National Football League (NFL). Phillips was selected by the San Diego Chargers in the third round out of Arkansas Tech University in the 1981 NFL draft. He played 15 games for the Chargers in 1981. In 1983, he played 5 games for the Los Angeles Raiders.
