= George Roberts (American football) =

American football player (born 1955)

No. 4, 12
- Position: Punter

Personal information
- Born: June 10, 1955 (age 71); Lynchburg, Virginia, U.S.
- Listed height: 6 ft 0 in (1.83 m)
- Listed weight: 181 lb (82 kg)

Career information
- High school: E. C. Glass (Lynchburg)
- College: Virginia Tech (1974–1977)
- NFL draft: 1978: undrafted

Career history
- Washington Redskins (1978)*; Miami Dolphins (1978–1980); San Diego Chargers (1981); Atlanta Falcons (1982)
- * Offseason or practice squad member only

Career NFL statistics
- Punts: 306
- Punt yards: 12,544
- Longest punt: 71
- Stats at Pro Football Reference

George William Roberts (born June 10, 1955) is an American former professional football player who was a punter for five seasons in the National Football League (NFL) with the Miami Dolphins, San Diego Chargers and Atlanta Falcons. He played college football for the Virginia Tech Hokies.

== Early life ==
George William Roberts was born on June 10, 1955, in Lynchburg, Virginia. He attended E. C. Glass High School in Lynchburg.

== College career ==
Roberts was a member of the Virginia Tech Hokies of Virginia Tech from 1974 to 1977 and was a two-year letterman from 1976 to 1977. He punted 68 times for 2,820 yards in 1976 and 61 punts for 2,525 yards in 1977.

== Professional career ==
After going undrafted in the 1978 NFL draft, Roberts signed with the Washington Redskins in June 1978. He was released on August 22, 1978.

Roberts was signed by the Dolphins on August 30, 1978. He played in all 16 games for the Dolphins during his rookie year in 1978, punting 81 times for 3,263 yards. He also appeared in one playoff game that year, punting five times for 243 yards. His 48.6 yards per punt was the most in the NFL during the postseason that year. Roberts played in 16 games again in 1979, recording 69 punts for 2,772 yards. He appeared in one playoff game as well that year, punting four times for 145 yards. He played in all 16 games for the Dolphins for the third consecutive season in 1980, totaling 77 punts for 3,279 yards.

On August 31, 1981, Roberts was traded to the San Diego Chargers for a 1982 sixth round draft pick. He appeared in 16 games for the Chargers during the 1981 season, totaling 62 punts for 2,540 yards. He was named the Pro Football Weekly NFL Special Teams Player of the Week for Week 13 after placing four of his six punts inside the Denver Broncos' 20-yard line. He also played in two playoff games, punting six times for 220 yards. Roberts was released on September 6, 1982.

Roberts signed with the Atlanta Falcons on December 15, 1982. He played in three games for the Falcons that year, punting 17 times for 690 yards. He also appeared in one playoff game, recording five punts for 213 yards. Roberts was placed on injured reserve the next year on August 22, 1983. He became a free agent after the 1983 season.
