= Andrew Gissinger =

American football player and CEO

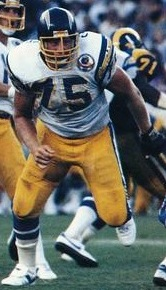
- Gissinger in 1984

No. 75
- Position: Offensive tackle

Personal information
- Born: July 4, 1959; Barberton, Ohio, U.S.
- Died: December 3, 2019 (aged 60)
- Listed height: 6 ft 5 in (1.96 m)
- Listed weight: 280 lb (127 kg)

Career information
- High school: Valley Forge (Parma Heights, Ohio)
- College: Syracuse
- NFL draft: 1981: 6th round, 141st overall pick

Career history
- San Diego Chargers (1982–1984)

Career NFL statistics
- Games played: 41
- Games started: 20
- Receptions: 1
- Stats at Pro Football Reference

Andrew Gissinger III (July 4, 1959 – December 3, 2019) was an American professional football player who was an offensive tackle for the San Diego Chargers of the National Football League (NFL). He played college football for the Syracuse Orange. After retiring from football, he became the president and chief operating officer of Countrywide Home Loans, Inc. Gissinger also owned and managed a private equity company.

== Education ==
Gissinger was an academic All American and four-year letterman at Syracuse University where he majored in business. He was the recipient of the Joseph Alexander Award for his athletic and academic accomplishments at Syracuse University. He attended Valley Forge High School in Parma Heights, Ohio.

== Football ==
Gissinger was a 6'5", 280 pound offensive tackle selected with the first pick of the sixth round (141st overall) in the 1981 NFL draft. He played his entire three-year NFL career for the San Diego Chargers from 1982 to 1984. In 1984, he also spent time playing tight end after injuries to regulars Kellen Winslow, Eric Sievers and Pete Holohan. Gissinger ruptured two disks in his back which ended his professional sports career.

== Banking ==
Gissinger served Countrywide Home Loans from 1994 through 1996, and then from 2000 through 2008 when the company was acquired by Bank of America. While at Countrywide, Gissinger was the president and executive managing director of the Home Loans division. He became famous for leading the 2007 "Protect Our House" campaign which urged Countrywide employees to take criticism of the company as a personal attack.

Bank of America retained Gissinger for a period of months after the acquisition to head several groups responsible for selling mortgages to consumers as the third highest-ranking official in the Bank of America Home Loans holding company. He was replaced by Craig Buffie, a 24-year Bank of America veteran. Prior to 2000, Gissinger owned and operated his own companies in real estate, development and mortgage banking.

== Personal life & death ==
Gissinger was the father of five sons.

Gissinger died from cancer on December 3, 2019 in California.
