= List of Cal State Hayward Pioneers head football coaches =

The Cal State Hayward Pioneers football program represented California State University, Hayward—now known as California State University, East Bay. The Pioneers began play in the Far Western Conference (FWC) in their inaugural 1965 season. They remained a member of the conference until the school gave up football after the 1993 season. The conference was renamed to the Northern California Athletic Conference (NCAC) in 1983. The school was known as California State College at Hayward through 1971, changing to California State University, Hayward in 1972. The school was not known as Cal State East Bay until 2005.

The program had four head coaches in its 29 seasons of existence and had an all time record of 125 wins, 159 losses, and 7 ties.

== Key ==
Key to symbols in coaches list
General		Overall		Conference		Postseason (Note: Although the first Rose Bowl Game was played in 1902, it has been continuously played since the 1916 game, and is recognized as the oldest bowl game by the NCAA. "—" indicates any season prior to 1916 when postseason games were not played.)	
No.	Order of coaches (Note: A running total of the number of head coaches, with coaches who served separate tenures being counted only once. Interim head coaches are represented with "Int" and are not counted in the running total. "—" indicates the team played but either without a coach or no coach is on record. "X" indicates an interim year without play.)	GC	Games coached	CW	Conference wins	PW	Postseason wins
DC	Division championships	OW	Overall wins	CL	Conference losses	PL	Postseason losses
CC	Conference championships	OL	Overall losses	CT	Conference ties	PT	Postseason ties
NC	National championships	OT	Overall ties (Note: Overtime rules in college football were introduced in 1996, making ties impossible in the period since.)	C%	Conference winning percentage		
†	Elected to the College Football Hall of Fame	O%	Overall winning percentage (Note: When computing the win–loss percentage, a tie counts as half a win and half a loss.)				

== Coaches ==
List of head football coaches showing season(s) coached, overall records, conference records, postseason records, and championships.
No.	Name	Season(s)	GC	OW	OL	OT	O%	CW	CL	CT	C%	PW	PL	PT	CCs	NCs
1	Darryl Rogers	1965	10	3	7	0	0.300	0	0	0	–	—	—	—	0	0
2	Les Davis	1966–1970	51	30	20	1	0.598	13	13	1	0.500	—	—	—	2	0
3	Bob Rodrigo	1971–1974	39	15	23	1	0.397	10	10	1	0.500	—	—	—	0	0
4	Tim Tierney	1975–1993	191	77	109	5	0.416	40	54	2	0.427	—	—	—	1	0
