= 1974 Boise State Broncos football team =

American college football season

1974 Boise State Broncos football
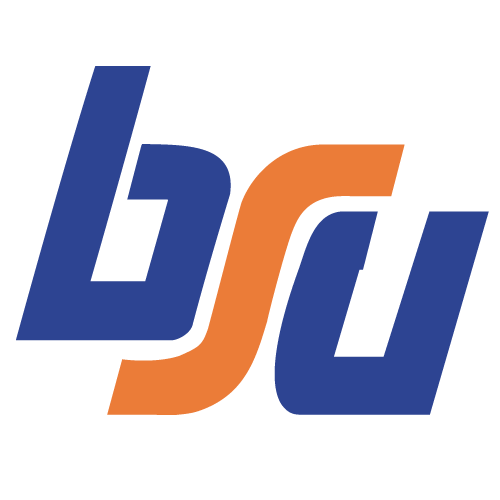

Big Sky champion

NCAA Division II Quarterfinal, L 6–20 at Central Michigan
- Conference: Big Sky Conference

Ranking
- Coaches: No. 3 (small college)
- AP: No. 5 (small college)
- Record: 10–2 (6–0 Big Sky)
- Head coach: Tony Knap (7th season)
- Home stadium: Bronco Stadium

1974 Big Sky Conference football standings
	Conf.					Overall
Team	W		L		T	W		L		T
No. 5 Boise State $^	6	–	0	–	0	10	–	2	–	0
Montana State	4	–	2	–	0	7	–	3	–	0
Idaho	2	–	2	–	1	2	–	8	–	1
Montana	2	–	3	–	1	3	–	6	–	1
Northern Arizona	2	–	3	–	0	3	–	6	–	0
Idaho State	2	–	4	–	0	5	–	5	–	0
Weber State	1	–	5	–	0	4	–	7	–	0
$ – Conference champion; ^ – NCAA Division II playoff participant; Rankings from AP small college poll

The 1974 Boise State Broncos football team represented Boise State University during the 1974 NCAA Division II football season, the seventh season of Bronco football (at the four-year level) and the second in the newly reorganized Division II. The Broncos were in their fifth year as members of the Big Sky Conference (and NCAA) and played their home games on campus at Bronco Stadium in Boise, Idaho. This was the first season as "BSU" as the school had recently become a university.

Led by seventh-year head coach Tony Knap, the Broncos were 10–1 in the regular season and were again undefeated in conference (6–0), repeating as Big Sky champions. The only loss was by two points in-mid season at Las Vegas; the UNLV Rebels were led by running back Mike Thomas, a future NFL Rookie of the Year, and sophomore quarterback Glenn Carano. They built a 31-point lead, then hung on as Boise State answered with four straight touchdown passes from senior Jim McMillan. UNLV was undefeated until the Grantland Rice Bowl, the Division II semifinals.

Invited again to the eight-team Division II playoffs, BSU drew a road game in the quarterfinals at Central Michigan; the Chippewas won 20–6 and went on to win the national title. CMU moved up to Division I in 1975, joining the Mid-American Conference (MAC). In the regular season, the Broncos had scored at least 35 points in every game.

Following this season, Bronco Stadium was expanded with an upper deck added to the east grandstand, which increased the permanent seating capacity to 20,000. Part of the original design, it had been delayed for five years due to high costs.

== Schedule ==
Date	Time	Opponent	Rank	Site	Result	Attendance	Source
September 14		at Cal Poly*		Mustang Stadium; San Luis Obispo, CA	W 41–21	5,700	
September 21	7:30 pm	Chico State*	No. 3	Bronco Stadium; Boise, ID	W 41–7	14,686	
September 28	1:30 pm	at Montana State	No. 3	Reno H. Sales Stadium; Bozeman, MT	W 40–37	9,100	
October 5	7:30 pm	Nevada*	No. 4	Bronco Stadium; Boise, ID (rivalry)	W 36–16	14,258	
October 12	7:30 pm	Idaho State	No. 4	Bronco Stadium; Boise, ID	W 61–3	14,310	
October 19	8:15 pm	at No. 5 UNLV*	No. 4	Las Vegas Stadium; Whitney, NV	L 35–37	18,631	
October 26		at Northern Arizona	No. 4	Lumberjack Stadium; Flagstaff, AZ	W 45–13	8,000	
November 2	1:30 pm	Weber State	No. 4	Bronco Stadium; Boise, ID	W 42–14	13,252	
November 9	1:30 pm	No. 13 UC Davis*^{†}	No. 4	Bronco Stadium; Boise, ID	W 41–20	14,608	
November 16	1:30 pm	at Montana	No. 4	Dornblaser Field; Missoula, MT	W 56–42	6,000	
November 23	1:30 pm	Idaho	No. 4	Bronco Stadium; Boise, ID (rivalry)	W 53–29	14,486	
November 30	11:00 am	at No. 6 Central Michigan*	No. 4	Perry Shorts Stadium; Mt. Pleasant, MI (NCAA Division II Quarterfinal)	L 6–20	9,913	
*Non-conference game; ^{†}Homecoming; Rankings from AP Poll released prior to the game; All times are in Mountain time

== Roster ==
1974 Boise State Broncos football team roster
Players
Coaches
Offense

Pos.	#	Name	Class
WR	8	John Crabtree	Jr
QB	12	Jim McMillan	Sr
QB	15	Lee Huey	Jr
WR	20	Mike Holton	So
RB	28	Tom Sims	So
FB	31	Ken Johnson	Sr
RB	33	Dave Nicly	Sr
RB	34	Bob Cleveland	Fr
RB	40	John Smith	Jr
RB	42	Ron Emry	Jr
C	50	Todd Whiteman	Jr
C	57	Ted Scoles	Sr
G	61	Glenn Sparks	Jr
OT	65	Greg Palin	Sr
G	69	Jim Ryan	Jr
OT	77	Carleton Ching	Sr
WR	89	Ray Hooft	Jr

Defense

Pos.	#	Name	Class
LCB	21	Gary Roslowich	So
RCB	24	Mike Campbell	Sr
SS	25	Pat King	Sr
FS	29	Rolly Woolsey	Sr
LLB	39	Gary Gorrell	Jr
RLB	45	Loren Schmidt	Sr
SS	49	Clint Sigman	Sr
MLB	51	Ron Davis	Sr
RDT	73	Saia Misa	Jr
LDT	78	Ron Franklin	Sr
RDE	85	Mark Clegg	Sr
LDE	88	Pete Poumele	Jr

Special teams

Pos.	#	Name	Class
KR	21	Gary Rosolwich	So
PR	29	Rolly Woolsey	Sr
P	39	Gary Gorrell	Jr
K	49	Clint Sigman	Jr

Head coach

- Tony Knap (7th year)

Coordinators/assistant coaches

- Steve Buratto (DB)
- Charlie Dine (DL/LB)
- Dave Nickel (OL)
- Adam Rita (WR)

Legend

- (C) Team captain
- (S) Suspended
- (I) Ineligible
- Injured
- Redshirt

== All-conference ==
Six Broncos were named to the Big Sky all-conference team:

- Jim McMillan, QB, (unanimous); conference MVP (offense)
- Mike Holton, WR, (unanimous)
- Rolly Woolsey, S, (unanimous)
- Loren Schmidt, LB
- Ron Davis, LB
- Saia Misa, DT

Boise State also placed six players on the second team.

Quarterback McMillan was a first-team Little All-American; Holton, Woolsey, and Schmidt were honorable mention.

== NFL draft ==
Three Broncos were selected in the 1975 NFL draft, which lasted 17 rounds (442 selections).

Player	Position	Round	Overall	Franchise
Rolly Woolsey	Defensive back	6th	148	Dallas Cowboys
Jim McMillan	Quarterback	14th	350	Detroit Lions
Ron Franklin	Defensive tackle	15th	386	St. Louis Cardinals
