= List of Cal State Fullerton Titans head football coaches =

The Cal State Fullerton Titans college football team represented California State University, Fullerton. The Tigers competed in the National Collegiate Athletic Association (NCAA) University Division in the years 1970–1992, and in the Pacific Coast Athletic Association (PCAA) / Big West Conference from 1975–1992. The football program was eliminated following the 1992 season.

The program had 4 head coaches in its 23 seasons of existence and compiled an all time record of 107 wins, 150 losses, and three ties.

== Key ==
Key to symbols in coaches list
| General | | Overall | | Conference | | Postseason (Note: Although the first Rose Bowl Game was played in 1902, it has been continuously played since the 1916 game, and is recognized as the oldest bowl game by the NCAA. "—" indicates any season prior to 1916 when postseason games were not played.) | |
|---|---|---|---|---|---|---|---|
| No. | Order of coaches (Note: A running total of the number of head coaches, with coaches who served separate tenures being counted only once. Interim head coaches are represented with "Int" and are not counted in the running total. "—" indicates the team played but either without a coach or no coach is on record. "X" indicates an interim year without play.) | GC | Games coached | CW | Conference wins | PW | Postseason wins |
| DC | Division championships | OW | Overall wins | CL | Conference losses | PL | Postseason losses |
| CC | Conference championships | OL | Overall losses | CT | Conference ties | PT | Postseason ties |
| NC | National championships | OT | Overall ties (Note: Overtime rules in college football were introduced in 1996, making ties impossible in the period since.) | C% | Conference winning percentage | | |
| † | Elected to the College Football Hall of Fame | O% | Overall winning percentage (Note: When computing the win–loss percentage, a tie counts as half a win and half a loss.) | | | | |

== Coaches ==
List of head football coaches showing season(s) coached, overall records, conference records, postseason records, and championships.
| No. | Name | Season(s) | GC | OW | OL | OT | O% | CW | CL | CT | C% | PW | PL | PT | CCs | NCs |
|---|---|---|---|---|---|---|---|---|---|---|---|---|---|---|---|---|
| 1 | Dick Coury | 1970–1971 | 22 | 13 | 8 | 1 | 0.614 | 6 | 2 | 0 | 0.750 | — | — | — | 0 | 0 |
| 2 | Pete Yoder | 1972–1974 | 33 | 18 | 15 | 0 | 0.545 | 3 | 5 | 0 | 0.375 | — | — | — | 0 | 0 |
| 3 | Jim Colletto | 1975–1979 | 56 | 17 | 38 | 1 | 0.313 | 4 | 18 | 0 | 0.182 | — | — | — | 0 | 0 |
| 4 | Gene Murphy | 1980–1992 | 149 | 60 | 88 | 1 | 0.406 | 36 | 47 | 0 | 0.434 | 0 | 1 | 0 | 2 | 0 |
