= 1974 Cal State Hayward Pioneers football team =

American college football season

1974 Cal State Hayward Pioneers football
- Conference: Far Western Conference
- Record: 3–6 (2–3 FWC)
- Head coach: Bob Rodrigo (4th season)
- Defensive coordinator: Tim Tierney (5th season)
- Home stadium: Pioneer Stadium

1974 Far Western Conference football standings
	Conf.					Overall
Team	W		L		T	W		L		T
UC Davis $	5	–	0	–	0	9	–	1	–	0
San Francisco State	2	–	3	–	0	5	–	6	–	0
Humboldt State	2	–	3	–	0	4	–	6	–	0
Chico State	2	–	3	–	0	4	–	7	–	0
Cal State Hayward	2	–	3	–	0	3	–	6	–	0
Sacramento State	2	–	3	–	0	2	–	9	–	0
$ – Conference champion

The 1974 Cal State Hayward Pioneers football team represented California State University, Hayward—now known as California State University, East Bay—as a member of the Far Western Conference (FWC) during the 1974 NCAA Division II football season. Led by Bob Rodrigo in his fourth and final season as head coach, Cal State Hayward compiled an overall record of 3–6 with a mark of 2–3 in conference play, placing in a five-way tie for second in the FWC. The team was outscored by its opponents 223 to 147 for the season. The Pioneers played home games at Pioneer Stadium in Hayward, California.

Rodrigo resigned as head coach in early 1975 and was succeeded by Tim Tierney, who had served the team's defensive coordinator for five seasons. Rodrigo finished his tenure as head coach at Cal State Hayward with a record of 15–23–1 for a winning percentage of .397.

== Schedule ==
Date	Opponent	Site	Result	Attendance	Source
September 28	Cal State Los Angeles*	Pioneer Stadium; Hayward, CA	L 26–34	1,000	
October 5	Sacramento State	Pioneer Stadium; Hayward, CA	L 7–10	1,500	
October 12	at Humboldt State	Redwood Bowl; Arcata, CA	W 28–20	2,800	
October 19	at UC Davis	Toomey Field; Davis, CA	L 0–37	8,000	
October 26	San Francisco State	Pioneer Stadium; Hayward, CA	L 25–28		
November 2	at Santa Clara*	Buck Shaw Stadium; Santa Clara, CA	L 13–35		
November 9	at Chico State	University Stadium; Chico, CA	W 17–10		
November 16	Cal Poly Pomona*	Pioneer Stadium; Hayward, CA	W 21–7	1,100	
November 23	at Cal Poly*	Mustang Stadium; San Luis Obispo, CA	L 10–42	4,283	
*Non-conference game
