= Tim Tierney (American football) =

American football player and coach (1937–2007)

Biographical details
- Born: October 3, 1943; Buffalo, New York, U.S.
- Died: September 15, 2012 (aged 68)

Playing career
- 1962–1964: San Francisco State
- Position: Defensive back

Coaching career (HC unless noted)
- 1969: Homestead HS (CA) (DC)
- 1970–1974: Cal State Hayward (DC)
- 1975–1993: Cal State Hayward

Head coaching record
- Overall: 77–109–5

Accomplishments and honors

Championships
- 1 FWC (1981)

Timothy Michael Tierney (October 3, 1943 – September 15, 2012) was an American football player and coach. He served as the head football coach at California State University, Hayward—now known as California State University, East Bay—from 1975 to 1993, compiling a record of 77–109–5.

Tierney was born on October 3, 1943, in Buffalo, New York, and grew up in San Francisco, where he graduated from St. Ignatius High School—now known as St. Ignatius College Preparatory in 1961. He played college football as San Francisco State University, earning All-Far Western Conference honors twice as a defensive back.

Tierney was the defensive coordinator at Homestead High School in Sunnyvale, California in 1969. He moved on to Cal State Hayward in 1970 to serve as defensive coordinator under head football coach Les Davis. Tierney remained defensive coordinator for five seasons, through Bob Rodrigo's four-year stint as head coach, before succeeding Rodrigo in 1975. Tierney had the longest tenure, 19 seasons, of the four head coaches of the Cal State Hayward Pioneers football program. After the dissolution of the football program following the 1993 season, Tierney remained at Cal State Hayward, working as a professor of kinesiology until 2001 and then serving as head coach of the men's and women's golf teams.

Tierney died on September 15, 2012, from complications following brain surgery.

== Head coaching record ==
| Year | Team | Overall | Conference | Standing | Bowl/playoffs |
|---|---|---|---|---|---|
Cal State Hayward Pioneers (Far Western Conference / Northern California Athletic Conference) (1975–1993)
| 1975 | Cal State Hayward | 0–10 | 0–5 | 6th | |
| 1976 | Cal State Hayward | 1–8–1 | 0–5 | 6th | |
| 1977 | Cal State Hayward | 6–3–1 | 2–2–1 | 3rd | |
| 1978 | Cal State Hayward | 8–2 | 4–1 | 2nd | |
| 1979 | Cal State Hayward | 2–8 | 1–4 | T–5th | |
| 1980 | Cal State Hayward | 6–4 | 3–2 | T–2nd | |
| 1981 | Cal State Hayward | 6–4–1 | 4–1 | T–1st | |
| 1982 | Cal State Hayward | 4–5–1 | 3–2 | T–2nd | |
| 1983 | Cal State Hayward | 6–4 | 3–3 | T–4th | |
| 1984 | Cal State Hayward | 7–3 | 4–2 | 3rd | |
| 1985 | Cal State Hayward | 6–3–1 | 2–2–1 | 3rd | |
| 1986 | Cal State Hayward | 7–3 | 3–2 | 3rd | |
| 1987 | Cal State Hayward | 2–8 | 2–3 | T–4th | |
| 1988 | Cal State Hayward | 2–9 | 1–4 | T–5th | |
| 1989 | Cal State Hayward | 1–8 | 1–4 | 5th | |
| 1990 | Cal State Hayward | 2–9 | 1–4 | T–4th | |
| 1991 | Cal State Hayward | 3–7 | 1–4 | 6th | |
| 1992 | Cal State Hayward | 5–5 | 3–2 | T–2nd | |
| 1993 | Cal State Hayward | 3–6 | 2–2 | T–2nd | |
| Cal State Hayward: | | 77–109–5 | 40–54–2 | | |
| Total: | | 77–109–5 | | | |
National championship Conference title Conference division title or championship game berth
