= 1974 Grantland Rice Bowl =

- 1974 Program covers
Delaware Fightin' Blue Hens	UNLV Rebels
(11–1)	(12–0)
Independent	Independent
49	11
Head coach: Tubby Raymond	Head coach: Ron Meyer
	1	2	3	4	Total
Delaware	0	21	7	21	49
UNLV	3	0	0	8	11
- Date: December 7, 1974
- Season: 1974
- Stadium: Tiger Stadium
- Location: Baton Rouge, Louisiana
- Attendance: 10,000

The 1974 Grantland Rice Bowl was an NCAA Division II game following the 1974 season, between the Delaware Fightin' Blue Hens and the UNLV Rebels. This was the first time that the game was played at Tiger Stadium on the campus of LSU. Delaware running back Vern Roberts was named the game's outstanding offensive player, while his teammate defensive back Mike Ebersol was named the game's outstanding defensive player.

== Notable participants ==
UNLV running back Mike Thomas and wide receiver Steve Haggerty were selected in the 1975 NFL draft, while guard Joe Ingersoll was selected in the 1976 NFL draft. Quarterback Glenn Carano, tight end Reggie Haynes, and tackle Blanchard Carter were selected in the 1977 NFL draft. Thomas, Ingersoll, Carano, and wide receiver Mike Haverty are inductees of the UNLV athletic hall of fame. Head coach Ron Meyer would later lead the New England Patriots and the Indianapolis Colts.

Delaware running back Nate Beasley was selected in the 1976 NFL Draft. Beasley and head coach Tubby Raymond are inductees of the Delaware athletics hall of fame. Raymond is an inductee of the College Football Hall of Fame, and the field at Delaware Stadium is named in his honor.

== Scoring summary ==
Scoring summary

Quarter	Time	Drive			Team	Scoring information	Score	
Quarter	Time	Plays	Yards	TOP	Team	Scoring information	UD	UNLV
1	8:37				UNLV	40-yard field goal by Jim Thayer	0	3
2	14:22	11	93		UD	Nate Beasley 8-yard touchdown run, Hank Kline kick good	7	3
2	1:39	6	60		UD	Vern Roberts 12-yard touchdown run, Hank Kline kick good	14	3
2	0:08	6	58		UD	Vern Roberts 7-yard touchdown run, Hank Kline kick good	21	3
3	10:59				UD	Vern Roberts 18-yard touchdown run, Hank Kline kick good	28	3
4	10:28				UD	Vern Roberts 3-yard touchdown run, Hank Kline kick good	35	3
4	1:41				UD	Bob Sabol 7-yard touchdown run, Hank Kline kick good	42	3
4	0:08				UNLV	Keith Beverly 3-yard touchdown run, 2-point pass good (Mike Haverty from Glenn Carano)	42	11
4	0:00				UD	Larry Wagner 53-yard kickoff return, Ben Belicic kick good	49	11
"TOP" = time of possession. For other American football terms, see Glossary of American football.							49	11
