= 1974 Cal State Fullerton Titans football team =

American college football season

1974 Cal State Fullerton Titans football
- Conference: Pacific Coast Athletic Association
- Record: 4–7 (0–0 PCAA)
- Head coach: Pete Yoder (3rd season)
- Home stadium: Santa Ana Stadium

1974 Pacific Coast Athletic Association football standings
	Conf.					Overall
Team	W		L		T	W		L		T
San Diego State $	4	–	0	–	0	8	–	2	–	1
San Jose State	2	–	2	–	0	8	–	3	–	1
Pacific (CA)	2	–	2	–	0	6	–	5	–	0
Long Beach State	1	–	3	–	0	6	–	5	–	0
Fresno State	1	–	3	–	0	5	–	7	–	0
Cal State Fullerton	0	–	0	–	0	4	–	6	–	0
$ – Conference champion

The 1974 Cal State Fullerton Titans football team represented California State University, Fullerton as a member of the Pacific Coast Athletic Association (PCAA) during the 1974 NCAA Division I football season. This was Cal State Fullerton's first year competing at the NCAA Division I level and as a member of the PCAA, but the Titans' games against conference opponents did not count in the conference standings until the 1975 season. They had previously been in the California Collegiate Athletic Association (CCAA). Led by third-year head coach Pete Yoder, Cal State Fullerton compiled an overall record 4–7. The Titans played home games at Santa Ana Stadium in Santa Ana, California.

== Schedule ==
Date	Opponent	Site	Result	Attendance	Source
September 7	at Northern Arizona*	Lumberjack Stadium; Flagstaff, AZ	W 10–7	6,800	
September 14	at UC Riverside*	Highlander Stadium; Riverside, CA	W 13–10	3,100–3,500	
September 21	Cal Poly*	Santa Ana Stadium; Santa Ana, CA	W 17–7	3,543	
September 28	Weber State*	Santa Ana Stadium; Santa Ana, CA	L 21–31	2,145	
October 5	Cal State Los Angeles*	Santa Ana Stadium; Santa Ana, CA	L 15–27	2,700–3,123	
October 12	at Long Beach State*	Anaheim Stadium; Anaheim, CA	L 6–28	7,312	
October 19	at Cal State Northridge*	Devonshire Downs; Northridge, CA	W 10–3	4,300	
October 26	Fresno State*	Santa Ana Stadium; Santa Ana, CA	L 21–48	2,100	
November 2	at Cal Poly Pomona*	Kellogg Field; Pomona, CA	L 25–32	2,600	
November 16	San Jose State*	Santa Ana Stadium; Santa Ana, CA	L 8–49	2,148–2,814	
November 23	at UC Davis*	Toomey Field; Davis, CA	L 21–30	4,300–4,400	
*Non-conference game

== Team players in the NFL ==
No Cal State Fullerton Titans were selected in the 1975 NFL draft.

The following finished their college career in 1974, were not drafted, but played in the NFL.

Player	Position	First NFL team
Johnnie Gray	Defensive back	1975 Green Bay Packers
