= Bobby Kemp =

American football player (1959–1998)

No. 26, 33
- Position: Safety

Personal information
- Born: May 29, 1959; Oakland, California, U.S.
- Died: February 7, 1998 (aged 38); Los Angeles, California, U.S.
- Listed height: 6 ft 0 in (1.83 m)
- Listed weight: 189 lb (86 kg)

Career information
- High school: North Miami Beach (North Miami Beach, Florida)
- College: Cal State Fullerton
- NFL draft: 1981: 8th round, 202nd overall pick

Career history
- Cincinnati Bengals (1981–1986); Tampa Bay Buccaneers (1987)

Career NFL statistics
- Interceptions: 10
- Fumble recoveries: 2
- Sacks: 4
- Stats at Pro Football Reference

Bobby Kemp (May 29, 1959 – February 7, 1998) was an American professional football player who was a safety for seven seasons with the Cincinnati Bengals and Tampa Bay Buccaneers in the National Football League (NFL). He played college football for the Cal State Fullerton Titans.

== College career ==
After attending Taft College, a junior college in Taft, California, he played college football at California State University, Fullerton for two seasons, with five interceptions his junior year (1979) and three his senior year (1980). He was selected 202nd overall by the Bengals in the eighth round of the 1981 NFL draft.

== Professional career ==
During his rookie season (1981), Kemp was the starting strong safety as the Bengals defeated the San Diego Chargers in the coldest game in NFL history, the AFC Championship Game dubbed the "Freezer Bowl" on January 10, 1982. With the Bengals holding a 17–7 lead and the Chargers offense driving late in the first half, Kemp intercepted a Dan Fouts pass to Kellen Winslow to thwart the drive. The Bengals went on to win, 27–7. The win propelled the Bengals to Super Bowl XVI, which they lost, 26–21, to the San Francisco 49ers. Kemp was the Bengals starter at strong safety in that game.

During his seven seasons as a strong safety and free safety with the Bengals, he played in 83 games, starting 69 of those. In 1983, he had three interceptions, and a career-best four in 1984. His last year in the NFL was in 1987 for the Buccaneers, for whom he started and played in 12 games as a strong safety with one interception.

== Personal life and death ==
Kemp later became a paramedic in Glendale, California, after retiring from football due to knee problems. He met his first wife, Christy, when they were students at Taft College. They were married for 13 years. On February 7, 1998, Kemp committed suicide in his North Hollywood, California home. He was 38. He was survived by his second wife, Inga, and their two-year-old daughter.
