= 1974 Cal Poly Pomona Broncos football team =

American college football season

1974 Cal Poly Pomona Broncos football
- Conference: California Collegiate Athletic Association
- Record: 5–3–2 (1–1–2 CCAA)
- Head coach: Andy Vinci (1st season)
- Home stadium: Kellogg Field

1974 California Collegiate Athletic Association football standings
	Conf.					Overall
Team	W		L		T	W		L		T
UC Riverside $	4	–	0	–	0	8	–	3	–	0
Cal Poly	2	–	1	–	1	5	–	4	–	1
Cal Poly Pomona	1	–	1	–	2	5	–	3	–	2
Cal State Northridge	1	–	3	–	0	2	–	9	–	0
Cal State Los Angeles	0	–	3	–	1	5	–	4	–	1
$ – Conference champion

The 1974 Cal Poly Pomona Broncos football team represented California State Polytechnic University, Pomona as a member of the California Collegiate Athletic Association (CCAA) during the 1974 NCAA Division II football season. Led by first-year head coach Andy Vinci, Cal Poly Pomona compiled an overall record of 5–3–2 with a mark of 1–1–2 in conference play, placing third in the CCAA. The team outscored its opponents 192 to 171 for the season. The Broncos played home games at Kellogg Field in Pomona, California.

== Schedule ==
Date	Opponent	Site	Result	Attendance	Source
September 7	at Fresno State*	Ratcliffe Stadium; Fresno, CA	W 13–12	7,527	
September 14	Southern Utah State*	Kellogg Field; Pomona, CA	W 37–27	2,000	
September 21	at San Francisco State*	Cox Stadium; San Francisco, CA	L 17–21	2,000	
September 28	Sacramento State*	Kellogg Field; Pomona, CA	W 21–0	3,800	
October 12	Cal Poly	Kellogg Field; Pomona, CA	T 14–14	8,500	
October 18	at Cal State Los Angeles	Campus Stadium; Los Angeles, CA	T 22–22	1,250–1,540	
October 26	UC Riverside	Kellogg Field; Pomona, CA	L 15–17	4,500	
November 2	Cal State Fullerton*	Kellogg Field; Pomona, CA	W 32–25	2,600	
November 9	at Cal State Northridge	Devonshire Downs; Northridge, CA	W 14–12	3,400	
November 16	at Cal State Hayward*	Pioneer Stadium; Hayward, CA	L 7–21	1,100	
*Non-conference game

== Team players in the NFL ==
No Cal Poly Pomona players were selected in the 1975 NFL draft. Quarterback Jim Zorn went on to play for a decade in the NFL, most notably as the starter for the expansion Seattle Seahawks.
