= 1974 Sacramento State Hornets football team =

American college football season

1974 Sacramento State Hornets football
- Conference: Far Western Conference
- Record: 2–9 (2–3 FWC)
- Head coach: Ray Clemons (14th season)
- Home stadium: Hornet Stadium

1974 Far Western Conference football standings
	Conf.					Overall
Team	W		L		T	W		L		T
UC Davis $	5	–	0	–	0	9	–	1	–	0
San Francisco State	2	–	3	–	0	5	–	6	–	0
Humboldt State	2	–	3	–	0	4	–	6	–	0
Chico State	2	–	3	–	0	4	–	7	–	0
Cal State Hayward	2	–	3	–	0	3	–	6	–	0
Sacramento State	2	–	3	–	0	2	–	9	–	0
$ – Conference champion

The 1974 Sacramento State Hornets football team represented California State University, Sacramento as a member of the Far Western Conference (FWC) during the 1974 NCAA Division II football season. Led by 14th-year head coach Ray Clemons, Sacramento State compiled an overall record of 2–9 with a mark of 2–3 in conference play, placing in a five-way tie for second place in the FWC. The team was outscored by its opponents 240 to 116 for the season. The Hornets played home games at Hornet Stadium in Sacramento, California.

== Schedule ==
Date	Opponent	Site	Result	Attendance	Source
September 7	at Pacific (CA)*	Pacific Memorial Stadium; Stockton, CA	L 0–21	13,000	
September 14	Nevada*	Hornet Stadium; Sacramento, CA	L 7–31	3,000–3,750	
September 21	Santa Clara*	Hornet Stadium; Sacramento, CA	L 9–14	3,750	
September 28	at Cal Poly Pomona*	Kellogg Field; Pomona, CA	L 0–21	3,800	
October 5	at Cal State Hayward	Pioneer Stadium; Hayward, CA	W 10–7	1,500	
October 12	at Puget Sound*	Baker Stadium; Tacoma, WA	L 16–35		
October 19	Humboldt State	Hornet Stadium; Sacramento, CA	L 6–23	3,900	
October 26	No. 15 UC Davis	Hornet Stadium; Sacramento, CA (rivalry)	L 17–22	6,500–7,500	
November 2	at San Francisco State	Cox Stadium; San Francisco, CA	W 27–17	3,000	
November 9	at Cal Lutheran*	Mt. Clef Field; Thousand Oaks, CA	L 0–24	1,500–3,000	
November 16	Chico State	Hornet Stadium; Sacramento, CA	L 24–25	4,000	
*Non-conference game; Rankings from AP Poll released prior to the game
