= Marvin Williams (American football) =

American football player (born 1963)

Personal information
- Born: October 11, 1963 (age 63); Santa Rosa, California, U.S.
- Listed height: 6 ft 3 in (1.91 m)
- Listed weight: 233 lb (106 kg)

Career information
- High school: North Collins High
- College: Fullerton State
- NFL draft: 1987: undrafted

Career history
- Washington Redskins (1987)
- Stats at Pro Football Reference

Marvin "Noah" Lee Williams (born October 11, 1963) is an American former professional football player who was a tight end in the National Football League (NFL). He played two games for the Washington Redskins in 1987. He played college football for the Cal State Fullerton Titans.
