= Grady Richardson =

American football player (born 1952)

No. 89
- Position: Tight end

Personal information
- Born: April 2, 1952 (age 74); Houston, Texas, U.S.
- Listed height: 6 ft 4 in (1.93 m)
- Listed weight: 226 lb (103 kg)

Career information
- High school: Wheatley (Houston, Texas)
- College: Pasadena CC (1970–1971); Cal State Fullerton (1972–1973)

Career history
- 1974–1975: The Hawaiians
- 1979–1980: Washington Redskins
- Stats at Pro Football Reference

Grady Gene Richardson (born April 2, 1952) is an American former professional football player who was a tight end in the National Football League (NFL) for the Washington Redskins. He played college football for the Cal State Fullerton Titans.
