= 1974 San Francisco State Gators football team =

American college football season

1974 San Francisco State Gators football
- Conference: Far Western Conference
- Record: 5–6 (2–3 FWC)
- Head coach: Vic Rowen (14th season)
- Home stadium: Cox Stadium

1974 Far Western Conference football standings
	Conf.					Overall
Team	W		L		T	W		L		T
UC Davis $	5	–	0	–	0	9	–	1	–	0
San Francisco State	2	–	3	–	0	5	–	6	–	0
Humboldt State	2	–	3	–	0	4	–	6	–	0
Chico State	2	–	3	–	0	4	–	7	–	0
Cal State Hayward	2	–	3	–	0	3	–	6	–	0
Sacramento State	2	–	3	–	0	2	–	9	–	0
$ – Conference champion

The 1974 San Francisco State Gators football team represented San Francisco State University as a member of the Far Western Conference (FWC) during the 1974 NCAA Division II football season. Led by 14th-year head coach Vic Rowen, San Francisco State compiled an overall record of 5–6 with a mark of 2–3 in conference play, placing in a five-way tie for second place in the FWC. For the season the team was outscored by its opponents 234 to 175. The Gators played home games at Cox Stadium in San Francisco.

== Schedule ==
Date	Opponent	Site	Result	Attendance	Source
September 7	at Nevada*	Mackay Stadium; Reno, NV	L 7–28	3,700	
September 14	at Puget Sound*	Baker Stadium; Tacoma, WA	L 0–28		
September 21	Cal Poly Pomona*	Cox Stadium; San Francisco, CA	W 21–17	2,000	
September 28	Cal State Northridge*	Cox Stadium; San Francisco, CA	W 7–6	1,200	
October 5	at Southern Oregon*	Fuller Field; Ashland, OR	L 18–21		
October 12	Western Oregon*	Cox Stadium; San Francisco, CA	W 37–17		
October 19	Chico State	Cox Stadium; San Francisco, CA	W 21–18		
October 26	at Cal State Hayward	Pioneer Stadium; Hayward, CA	W 28–25		
November 2	Sacramento State	Cox Stadium; San Francisco, CA	L 17–27	3,000	
November 9	at Humboldt State	Redwood Bowl; Arcata, CA	L 12–16		
November 16	UC Davis	Cox Stadium; San Francisco, CA	L 7–31	2,000	
*Non-conference game
