= 1974 Cal Poly Mustangs football team =

American college football season

1974 Cal Poly Mustangs football
- Conference: California Collegiate Athletic Association
- Record: 5–4–1 (2–1–1 CCAA)
- Head coach: Joe Harper (7th season)
- Home stadium: Mustang Stadium

1974 California Collegiate Athletic Association football standings
	Conf.					Overall
Team	W		L		T	W		L		T
UC Riverside $	4	–	0	–	0	8	–	3	–	0
Cal Poly	2	–	1	–	1	5	–	4	–	1
Cal Poly Pomona	1	–	1	–	2	5	–	3	–	2
Cal State Northridge	1	–	3	–	0	2	–	9	–	0
Cal State Los Angeles	0	–	3	–	1	5	–	4	–	1
$ – Conference champion

The 1974 Cal Poly Mustangs football team represented California Polytechnic State University, San Luis Obispo as a member of the California Collegiate Athletic Association (CCAA) during the 1974 NCAA Division II football season. Led by seventh-year head coach Joe Harper, Cal Poly compiled an overall record of 5–4–1 with a mark of 2–1–1 in conference play, placing second in the CCAA. The Mustangs played home games at Mustang Stadium in San Luis Obispo, California.

== Schedule ==
Date	Opponent	Rank	Site	Result	Attendance	Source
September 14	No. 3 Boise State*		Mustang Stadium; San Luis Obispo, CA	L 21–41	5,700	
September 21	at Cal State Fullerton*	No. 14	Santa Ana Stadium; Santa Ana, CA	L 7–17	3,543	
September 28	at Fresno State*		Ratcliffe Stadium; Fresno, CA	W 17–13	10,417–11,284	
October 5	UC Riverside		Mustang Stadium; San Luis Obispo, CA	L 10–24	5,000–6,793	
October 12	at Cal Poly Pomona		Kellogg Field; Pomona, CA	T 14–14	8,500	
October 26	Cal State Northridge		Mustang Stadium; San Luis Obispo, CA	W 45–3	6,125	
November 2	Nevada*		Mustang Stadium; San Luis Obispo, CA	W 37–23	5,980	
November 16	at Idaho State*		ASISU Minidome; Pocatello, ID	L 7–12	6,500–8,000	
November 23	Cal State Hayward*		Mustang Stadium; San Luis Obispo, CA	W 42–10	4,283	
November 27	at Cal State Los Angeles		Campus Stadium; Los Angeles, CA	W 44–10	1,000–1,440	
*Non-conference game; Rankings from UPI Poll released prior to the game

== Team players in the NFL ==
No Cal Poly Mustang players were selected in the 1975 NFL draft.

The following finished their college career in 1974, were not drafted, but played in the NFL.

Player	Position	First NFL team
Don Milan	Quarterback	1975 Green Bay Packers
