= Bob Rodrigo =

American football player and coach (1937–2007)

Biographical details
- Born: c. 1936

Playing career
- 1954–1957: San Francisco State
- Position: Fullback

Coaching career (HC unless noted)
- 1958–1959: San Francisco State (JV)
- 1960: Clayton Valley HS (CA) (assistant)
- 1961–1967: San Francisco State (backfield)
- 1968–1970: Cal State Hayward (assistant)
- 1971–1974: Cal State Hayward

Head coaching record
- Overall: 15–23–1

Bob Rodrigo (born c. 1936) is an American former football player and coach. He served as the head football coach at California State University, Hayward—now known as California State University, East Bay—from 1971 to 1974, compiling a record of 15–23–1.

Rodrigo attended Vallejo High School in Vallejo, California, and played college football at San Francisco State University, where he started as a fullback from 1954 to 1957, twice earning Little All-America honors. After graduating from San Francisco State, he remained at the school to coach the junior varsity teams in football, basketball, and baseball, and teach physical education. In 1960, Rodrigo became an assistant football coach at Clayton Valley High School in Concord, California, under head football coach Pat Murphy. Rodrigo returned to San Francisco State in 1961 as backfield coach under newly appointed head football coach Vic Rowen. Rodrigo moved on to Cal State Hayward in 1968 to serve as an assistant football coach under Les Davis. He succeeded Davis as head coach in February 1971 when Davis left for New Mexico Highlands University.

== Head coaching record ==
Year	Team	Overall	Conference	Standing	Bowl/playoffs
Cal State Hayward Pioneers (Far Western Conference) (1971–1974)
1971	Cal State Hayward	7–2–1	3–2–1	3rd	
1972	Cal State Hayward	2–8	2–3	T–3rd	
1973	Cal State Hayward	3–7	3–2	T–3rd	
1974	Cal State Hayward	3–6	2–3	T–2nd	
Cal State Hayward:		15–23–1	10–10–1		
Total:		15–23–1			
