= 1974 Northern Arizona Lumberjacks football team =

American college football season

1974 Northern Arizona Lumberjacks football
- Conference: Big Sky Conference
- Record: 3–6 (2–3 Big Sky)
- Head coach: Ed Peasley (4th season)
- Home stadium: Lumberjack Stadium

1974 Big Sky Conference football standings
	Conf.					Overall
Team	W		L		T	W		L		T
No. 5 Boise State $^	6	–	0	–	0	10	–	2	–	0
Montana State	4	–	2	–	0	7	–	3	–	0
Idaho	2	–	2	–	1	2	–	8	–	1
Montana	2	–	3	–	1	3	–	6	–	1
Northern Arizona	2	–	3	–	0	3	–	6	–	0
Idaho State	2	–	4	–	0	5	–	5	–	0
Weber State	1	–	5	–	0	4	–	7	–	0
$ – Conference champion; ^ – NCAA Division II playoff participant; Rankings from AP small college poll

The 1974 Northern Arizona Lumberjacks football team represented Northern Arizona University as a member of the Big Sky Conference during the 1974 NCAA Division II football season. Led by fourth-year head coach Ed Peasley, the Lumberjacks compiled an overall record of 3–6, with a mark of 2–3 in conference play, and finished fifth in the Big Sky.

== Schedule ==
Date	Opponent	Site	Result	Attendance	Source
September 7	Cal State Fullerton*	Lumberjack Stadium; Flagstaff, AZ	L 7–10	6,800	
September 14	North Dakota State*	Lumberjack Stadium; Flagstaff, AZ	W 27–15	6,000	
September 21	No. 10 UNLV*	Lumberjack Stadium; Flagstaff, AZ	L 14–31	7,800	
September 28	Idaho State	Lumberjack Stadium; Flagstaff, AZ	W 20–15	8,850	
October 5	at Montana State	Sales Stadium; Bozeman, MT	L 21–44	5,500	
October 12	at Montana	Dornblaser Field; Missoula, MT	L 0–27	6,100	
October 19	Weber State	Lumberjack Stadium; Flagstaff, AZ	W 21–20	4,200	
October 26	No. 4 Boise State	Lumberjack Stadium; Flagstaff, AZ	L 13–45	8,000	
November 9	at Drake*	Drake Stadium; Des Moines, IA	L 16–34	5,800	
*Non-conference game; Rankings from AP Poll released prior to the game
