= 1974 Idaho State Bengals football team =

American college football season

1974 Idaho State Bengals football
- Conference: Big Sky Conference
- Record: 5–5 (2–4 Big Sky)
- Head coach: Bob Griffin (3rd season)
- Home stadium: ASISU Minidome

1974 Big Sky Conference football standings
	Conf.					Overall
Team	W		L		T	W		L		T
No. 5 Boise State $^	6	–	0	–	0	10	–	2	–	0
Montana State	4	–	2	–	0	7	–	3	–	0
Idaho	2	–	2	–	1	2	–	8	–	1
Montana	2	–	3	–	1	3	–	6	–	1
Northern Arizona	2	–	3	–	0	3	–	6	–	0
Idaho State	2	–	4	–	0	5	–	5	–	0
Weber State	1	–	5	–	0	4	–	7	–	0
$ – Conference champion; ^ – NCAA Division II playoff participant; Rankings from AP small college poll

The 1974 Idaho State Bengals football team represented Idaho State University as a member of the Big Sky Conference during the 1974 NCAA Division II football season. Led by third-year head coach Bob Griffin, the Bengals compiled an overall record of 5–5, with a mark of 2–4 in conference play, and finished sixth in the Big Sky.

== Schedule ==
Date	Opponent	Site	Result	Attendance	Source
September 21	Nevada*	ASISU Minidome; Pocatello, ID	W 13–7	10,800–11,000	
September 28	at Northern Arizona	Lumberjack Stadium; Flagstaff, AZ	L 15–20	8,850	
October 5	Idaho	ASISU Minidome; Pocatello, ID (rivalry)	L 9–28	12,000	
October 12	at No. 4 Boise State	Bronco Stadium; Boise, ID	L 3–61	14,310	
October 19	at Montana State	Sales Stadium; Bozeman, MT	L 0–14	9,133	
October 26	at Weber State	Wildcat Stadium; Ogden, UT	W 10–8	7,126	
November 2	Portland State*	ASISU Minidome; Pocatello, ID	W 24–16	7,500	
November 9	Montana	ASISU Minidome; Pocatello, ID	W 25–22	8,000	
November 16	Cal Poly*	ASISU Minidome; Pocatello, ID	W 12–7	6,500–8,000	
November 23	at No. 2 UNLV*	Las Vegas Stadium; Whitney, NV	L 7–31	8,654	
*Non-conference game; Rankings from AP Poll released prior to the game
