= 1974 Montana Grizzlies football team =

American college football season

1974 Montana Grizzlies football
- Conference: Big Sky Conference
- Record: 3–6–1 (2–3–1 Big Sky)
- Head coach: Jack Swarthout (8th season)
- Home stadium: Dornblaser Field

1974 Big Sky Conference football standings
	Conf.					Overall
Team	W		L		T	W		L		T
No. 5 Boise State $^	6	–	0	–	0	10	–	2	–	0
Montana State	4	–	2	–	0	7	–	3	–	0
Idaho	2	–	2	–	1	2	–	8	–	1
Montana	2	–	3	–	1	3	–	6	–	1
Northern Arizona	2	–	3	–	0	3	–	6	–	0
Idaho State	2	–	4	–	0	5	–	5	–	0
Weber State	1	–	5	–	0	4	–	7	–	0
$ – Conference champion; ^ – NCAA Division II playoff participant; Rankings from AP small college poll

The 1974 Montana Grizzlies football team was an American football team that represented the University of Montana in the Big Sky Conference during the 1974 NCAA Division II football season. In their eighth year under head coach Jack Swarthout, the team compiled a 3–6–1 record, (2–3–1 in Big Sky, fourth).

== Schedule ==
Date	Time	Opponent	Site	Result	Attendance	Source
September 6		at Simon Fraser*	Empire Stadium; Vancouver, BC	L 14–23	6,000	
September 21		at South Dakota*	Inman Field; Vermillion, SD	L 10–24	6,000	
September 28		at No. 7 UNLV*	Las Vegas Stadium; Whitney, NV	L 17–20	11,524–11,544	
October 5	1:30 pm	Weber State	Dornblaser Field; Missoula, MT	W 24–13	5,000	
October 12		Northern Arizona	Dornblaser Field; Missoula, MT	W 27–0	6,100	
October 19	2:30 pm	at Idaho	Idaho Stadium; Moscow, ID (Little Brown Stein)	T 35–35	16,500	
October 26		at Portland State*	Civic Stadium; Portland, OR	W 24–14	4,986	
November 2		Montana State	Dornblaser Field; Missoula, MT (rivalry)	L 29–43	12,054–12,058	
November 9		at Idaho State	ASISU Minidome; Pocatello, ID	L 22–25	8,000	
November 16	1:30 pm	No. 4 Boise State	Dornblaser Field; Missoula, MT	L 42–56	5,100	
*Non-conference game; Rankings from AP Poll released prior to the game; All times are in Mountain time
