= 1974 Cal State Los Angeles Diablos football team =

American college football season

1974 Cal State Los Angeles Diablos football
- Conference: California Collegiate Athletic Association
- Record: 5–4–1 (0–3–1 CCAA)
- Head coach: Jim Williams (4th season)
- Home stadium: Campus Stadium

1974 California Collegiate Athletic Association football standings
	Conf.					Overall
Team	W		L		T	W		L		T
UC Riverside $	4	–	0	–	0	8	–	3	–	0
Cal Poly	2	–	1	–	1	5	–	4	–	1
Cal Poly Pomona	1	–	1	–	2	5	–	3	–	2
Cal State Northridge	1	–	3	–	0	2	–	9	–	0
Cal State Los Angeles	0	–	3	–	1	5	–	4	–	1
$ – Conference champion

The 1974 Cal State Los Angeles Diablos football team represented California State University, Los Angeles as a member of the California Collegiate Athletic Association (CCAA) during the 1974 NCAA Division II football season. Cal State Los Angeles dropped down from NCAA Division I to NCAA Division II competition in 1974, leaving the Pacific Coast Athletic Association (PCAA). Led by fourth-year head coach Jim Williams, who had helmed the team from 1966 to 1968, the Diablos compiled an overall record of 5–4–1 with a mark of 0–3–1 in conference play, placing last out of five teams in the CCAA, although they had the program's first winning season since 1968. The team was outscored 243 to 233 for the season. The Diablos played home games at the Campus Stadium in Los Angeles.

== Schedule ==
Date	Opponent	Site	Result	Attendance	Source
September 21	Southern Utah State*	Campus Stadium; Los Angeles, CA	W 28–12	603–1,300	
September 28	at Cal State Hayward*	Pioneer Stadium; Hayward, CA	W 34–26	1,000	
October 5	at Cal State Fullerton*	Santa Ana Stadium; Santa Ana, CA	W 27–15	2,700–3,123	
October 11	San Diego*	Campus Stadium; Los Angeles, CA	W 36–10	1,420–1,500	
October 18	Cal Poly Pomona	Campus Stadium; Los Angeles, CA	T 22–22	1,250–1,540	
November 2	at UC Riverside	Highlander Stadium; Riverside, CA	L 22–25	3,100–3,701	
November 8	Southern*	Los Angeles Memorial Coliseum; Los Angeles, CA (Gold Rush Classic)	L 8–42	10,000–10,079	
November 15	Azusa Pacific*	Campus Stadium; Los Angeles, CA	W 6–3	750–1,400	
November 23	at Cal State Northridge	Devonshire Downs; Northridge, CA	L 40–44	2,500–4,500	
November 27	Cal Poly	Campus Stadium; Los Angeles, CA	L 10–44	1,000–1,440	
*Non-conference game
