= 1974 Fresno State Bulldogs football team =

American college football season

1974 Fresno State Bulldogs football
- Conference: Pacific Coast Athletic Association
- Record: 5–7 (1–3 PCAA)
- Head coach: J. R. Boone (2nd season)
- Home stadium: Ratcliffe Stadium

1974 Pacific Coast Athletic Association football standings
	Conf.					Overall
Team	W		L		T	W		L		T
San Diego State $	4	–	0	–	0	8	–	2	–	1
San Jose State	2	–	2	–	0	8	–	3	–	1
Pacific (CA)	2	–	2	–	0	6	–	5	–	0
Long Beach State	1	–	3	–	0	6	–	5	–	0
Fresno State	1	–	3	–	0	5	–	7	–	0
Cal State Fullerton	0	–	0	–	0	4	–	6	–	0
$ – Conference champion

The 1974 Fresno State Bulldogs football team represented California State University, Fresno as a member of the Pacific Coast Athletic Association (PCAA) during the 1974 NCAA Division I football season. Led by second-year head coach J. R. Boone, Fresno State compiled an overall record of 5–7 with a mark of 1–3 in conference play, tying for fourth place in the PCAA. The Bulldogs played their home games at Ratcliffe Stadium on the campus of Fresno City College in Fresno, California.

== Schedule ==
Date	Opponent	Site	Result	Attendance	Source
September 7	Cal Poly Pomona*	Ratcliffe Stadium; Fresno, CA	L 12–13	7,527	
September 14	at San Jose State	Spartan Stadium; San Jose, CA (rivalry)	L 7–28	16,155	
September 21	Montana State*	Ratcliffe Stadium; Fresno, CA	L 7–14	9,987	
September 28	Cal Poly*	Ratcliffe Stadium; Fresno, CA	L 13–17	10,417–11,284	
October 5	at New Mexico State*	Memorial Stadium; Las Cruces, NM	W 9–7	10,833	
October 12	at San Diego State	San Diego Stadium; San Diego, CA (rivalry)	L 21–24	35,394	
October 19	Pacific (CA)	Ratcliffe Stadium; Fresno, CA	W 37–21	8,277	
October 26	at Cal State Fullerton*	Santa Ana Stadium; Santa Ana, CA	W 48–21	2,100	
November 2	at Cal State Northridge*	Devonshire Downs; Northridge, CA	W 41–0	2,100	
November 9	Long Beach State	Ratcliffe Stadium; Fresno, CA	L 24–28	8,850	
November 15	Wichita State*	Ratcliffe Stadium; Fresno, CA	W 24–12	5,878	
November 23	at Hawaii*	Honolulu Stadium; Honolulu, HI (rivalry)	L 7–21	10,628	
*Non-conference game
