= 1974 UC Davis Aggies football team =

American college football season

1974 UC Davis Aggies football

FWC champion
- Conference: Far Western Conference
- Record: 9–1 (5–0 FWC)
- Head coach: Jim Sochor (5th season)
- Captains: Rick Fortner; Steve Lard; Phil Wells
- Home stadium: Toomey Field

1974 Far Western Conference football standings
	Conf.					Overall
Team	W		L		T	W		L		T
UC Davis $	5	–	0	–	0	9	–	1	–	0
San Francisco State	2	–	3	–	0	5	–	6	–	0
Humboldt State	2	–	3	–	0	4	–	6	–	0
Chico State	2	–	3	–	0	4	–	7	–	0
Cal State Hayward	2	–	3	–	0	3	–	6	–	0
Sacramento State	2	–	3	–	0	2	–	9	–	0
$ – Conference champion

The 1974 UC Davis Aggies football team represented the University of California, Davis as a member of the Far Western Conference (FWC) during the 1974 NCAA Division II football season. Led by fifth-year head coach Jim Sochor, UC Davis compiled an overall record of 9–1 with a mark of 5–0 in conference play, winning the FWC title for the fourth consecutive season. 1973 was the fifth consecutive winning season for the Aggies. With the 5–0 conference record, they stretched their conference winning streak to eight games dating back to the previous season. The team outscored its opponents 297 to 143 for the season. The Aggies played home games at Toomey Field in Davis, California.

== Schedule ==
Date	Opponent	Rank	Site	Result	Attendance	Source
September 14	Portland State*		Toomey Field; Davis, CA	W 50–21	5,200	
September 21	UC Riverside*		Toomey Field; Davis, CA	W 42–7	5,800	
September 28	at Santa Clara*		Buck Shaw Stadium; Santa Clara, CA	W 23–22	7,135	
October 12	at Chico State		University Stadium; Chico, CA	W 28–0	7,000	
October 19	Cal State Hayward		Toomey Field; Davis, CA	W 37–0	8,000	
October 26	at Sacramento State	No. 14	Charles C. Hughes Stadium; Sacramento, CA (rivalry)	W 22–17	6,500–7,500	
November 2	Humboldt State	No. 12	Toomey Field; Davis, CA	W 14–7	7,500	
November 9	at No. 3 Boise State*	No. 11	Bronco Stadium; Boise, ID	L 20–41	14,608	
November 16	at San Francisco State		Cox Stadium; San Francisco, CA	W 31–7	2,000	
November 23	Cal State Fullerton*		Toomey Field; Davis, CA	W 30–21	4,300–4,400	
*Non-conference game; Rankings from UPI Poll released prior to the game
