= Obie Graves =

American and Canadian football running back

Obie Graves is a former Citrus College and Cal State Fullerton football player, who played three seasons in the Canadian Football League.

== Football career ==
While at Monrovia High School, he played for the football time in the halfback position from 1972 until 1974.

Graves went on to Citrus College, where he played from 1975 to 1976. While there, he earned and still holds the records for: Most Carries In A Season: (235), for the 1975 season; Most Rushing Yards In A Season (1228), for the 1976 season; Most All Purpose Yards In A Season (1445), for the 1976 season; Most Points In A Season: (108) for the 1976 season, Most Touchdowns In A Season: (18) for the 1976 season, Most Points In A Career: (138), for his career there spanning 1975-1976; and Most Touchdowns In A Career: (23) for 1975-1976.

Graves transferred to Cal State Fullerton in 1977 and played for their football team as a running back. In 1978, he ran a total of 219 yards in their game against San Jose State.

Graves played in the Canadian Football League after he graduated from college, playing two seasons as a running back for the Hamilton Tiger-Cats, in 1980 and 1982 and one season for the Winnipeg Blue Bombers in 1981. He holds the Tiger-Cat record for most carries in a game, with thirty-three carries.
