= 1974 UC Riverside Highlanders football team =

American college football season

1974 UC Riverside Highlanders football

CCAA champion
- Conference: California Collegiate Athletic Association
- Record: 8–3 (4–0 CCAA)
- Head coach: Bob Toledo (1st season)
- Home stadium: Highlander Stadium

1974 California Collegiate Athletic Association football standings
	Conf.					Overall
Team	W		L		T	W		L		T
UC Riverside $	4	–	0	–	0	8	–	3	–	0
Cal Poly	2	–	1	–	1	5	–	4	–	1
Cal Poly Pomona	1	–	1	–	2	5	–	3	–	2
Cal State Northridge	1	–	3	–	0	2	–	9	–	0
Cal State Los Angeles	0	–	3	–	1	5	–	4	–	1
$ – Conference champion

The 1974 Cal Poly Pomona Broncos football team represented the University of California, Riverside as a member of the California Collegiate Athletic Association (CCAA) during the 1974 NCAA Division II football season. Led by first-year head coach Bob Toledo, UC Riverside compiled an overall record of 8–3 with a mark of 4–0 in conference play, winning the CCAA title. The team outscored its opponents 233 to 171 for the season. The Highlanders played home games Highlander Stadium in Riverside, California.

UC Riverside competed in the California Collegiate Athletic Association (CCAA). The team was led by first-year head coach Bob Toledo. They played home games at Highlander Stadium in Riverside, California. The Highlanders finished the season as champion of the CCAA, with a record of eight wins and three losses (8–3, 4–0 CCAA). Overall, the team outscored its opponents 233–171 for the season.

== Schedule ==
Date	Opponent	Site	Result	Attendance	Source
September 14	Cal State Fullerton*	Highlander Stadium; Riverside, CA	L 10–13	3,100–3,500	
September 21	at UC Davis*	Toomey Field; Davis, CA	L 7–42	5,800	
September 28	Whittier*	Highlander Stadium; Riverside, CA	W 34–24	2,000–2,500	
October 5	at Cal Poly	Mustang Stadium; San Luis Obispo, CA	W 24–10	5,000–6,793	
October 12	Simon Fraser*	Highlander Stadium; Riverside, CA	W 14–7	2,499–4,500	
October 19	at Redlands*	Redlands Stadium; Redlands, CA	W 24–7	3,000	
October 26	at Cal Poly Pomona	Kellogg Field; Pomona, CA	W 17–15	4,500	
November 2	Cal State Los Angeles	Highlander Stadium; Riverside, CA	W 25–22	3,100–3,701	
November 9	United States International*	Balboa Stadium; San Diego, CA	L 13–16	1,000–1,800	
November 16	Cal State Northridge	Highlander Stadium; Riverside, CA	W 17–15	3,100	
November 23	San Diego*	Highlander Stadium; Riverside, CA	W 48–0	2,600	
*Non-conference game
