= 1974 Cal State Northridge Matadors football team =

American college football season

1974 Cal State Northridge Matadors football
- Conference: California Collegiate Athletic Association
- Record: 2–9 (1–3 CCAA)
- Head coach: Gary Torgeson (2nd season)
- Home stadium: North Campus Stadium

1974 California Collegiate Athletic Association football standings
	Conf.					Overall
Team	W		L		T	W		L		T
UC Riverside $	4	–	0	–	0	8	–	3	–	0
Cal Poly	2	–	1	–	1	5	–	4	–	1
Cal Poly Pomona	1	–	1	–	2	5	–	3	–	2
Cal State Northridge	1	–	3	–	0	2	–	9	–	0
Cal State Los Angeles	0	–	3	–	1	5	–	4	–	1
$ – Conference champion

The 1974 Cal State Northridge Matadors football team represented California State University, Northridge as a member of the California Collegiate Athletic Association (CCAA) during the 1974 NCAA Division II football season. Led by second-year head coach Gary Torgeson, Cal State Northridge compiled an overall record of 2–9 with a mark of 1–3 in conference play, placing fourth in the CCAA. The team was outscored by its opponents 265 to 126 for the season and was held to less than 10 points five times. The Matadors played home games at North Campus Stadium in Northridge, California.

== Schedule ==
Date	Opponent	Site	Result	Attendance	Source
September 7	at San Diego*	Torero Stadium; San Diego, CA	W 17–13	2,900	
September 14	Santa Clara*	North Campus Stadium; Northridge, CA	L 12–31	4,000	
September 21	at Weber State*	Wildcat Stadium; Ogden, UT	L 0–28	8,369	
September 28	at San Francisco State*	Cox Stadium; San Francisco, CA	L 6–7	1,200	
October 12	at Nevada*	Mackay Stadium; Reno, NV	L 14–19	5,100	
October 19	Cal State Fullerton*	North Campus Stadium; Northridge, CA	L 3–10	4,300	
October 26	at Cal Poly	Mustang Stadium; San Luis Obispo, CA	L 3–45	6,125	
November 2	Fresno State*	North Campus Stadium; Northridge, CA	L 0–41	2,100	
November 9	Cal Poly Pomona	North Campus Stadium; Northridge, CA	L 12–14	3,400	
November 16	at UC Riverside	Highlander Stadium; Riverside, CA	L 15–17	3,100	
November 23	Cal State Los Angeles	North Campus Stadium; Northridge, CA	W 44–40	2,500–4,500	
*Non-conference game
