= 1974 Chico State Wildcats football team =

American college football season

1974 Chico State Wildcats football
- Conference: Far Western Conference
- Record: 4–7 (2–3 FWC)
- Head coach: Dick Trimmer (1st season)
- Offensive coordinator: Mike Rasmussen (1st season)
- Home stadium: University Stadium

1974 Far Western Conference football standings
	Conf.					Overall
Team	W		L		T	W		L		T
UC Davis $	5	–	0	–	0	9	–	1	–	0
San Francisco State	2	–	3	–	0	5	–	6	–	0
Humboldt State	2	–	3	–	0	4	–	6	–	0
Chico State	2	–	3	–	0	4	–	7	–	0
Cal State Hayward	2	–	3	–	0	3	–	6	–	0
Sacramento State	2	–	3	–	0	2	–	9	–	0
$ – Conference champion

The 1974 Chico State Wildcats football team represented California State University, Chico as a member of the Far Western Conference (FWC) during the 1974 NCAA Division II football season. Led by first-year head coach Dick Trimmer, Chico State compiled an overall record of 4–7 with a mark of 2–3 in conference play, placing in a five-way tie for second in the FWC. The team was outscored by its opponents 235 to 146 for the season. The Wildcats played home games at University Stadium in Chico, California.

== Schedule ==
Date	Opponent	Site	Result	Attendance	Source
September 7?	Chico State alumni*	University Stadium; Chico, CA	L 2–6		
September 14	Simon Fraser*	University Stadium; Chico, CA	W 8–7		
September 21	at Boise State*	Bronco Stadium; Boise, ID	L 7–41	14,686	
September 28	Willamette*	University Stadium; Chico, CA	L 9–14		
October 5	at Humboldt State	Redwood Bowl; Arcata, CA	W 31–28	2,000	
October 12	UC Davis	University Stadium; Chico, CA	L 0–28	7,000	
October 19	at San Francisco State	Cox Stadium; San Francisco, CA	L 18–21		
October 26	at Nevada*	Mackay Stadium; Reno, NV	L 12–30	3,200	
November 2	at Southern Utah State*	Eccles Coliseum; Cedar City, UT	W 24–19		
November 9	Cal State Hayward	University Stadium; Chico, California	L 10–17		
November 16	at Sacramento State	Hornet Stadium; Sacramento, CA	W 25–24		
*Non-conference game
