= 1974 Idaho Vandals football team =

American college football season

1974 Idaho Vandals football
- Conference: Big Sky Conference
- Record: 2–8–1 (2–2–1 Big Sky)
- Head coach: Ed Troxel (1st season)
- Offensive coordinator: Dennis Erickson (1st season)
- Offensive scheme: Veer
- Defensive coordinator: A. J. Christoff (1st season)
- Base defense: 5–2
- Captains: Mark Fredback; Joe White
- Home stadium: Idaho Stadium

1974 Big Sky Conference football standings
	Conf.					Overall
Team	W		L		T	W		L		T
No. 5 Boise State $^	6	–	0	–	0	10	–	2	–	0
Montana State	4	–	2	–	0	7	–	3	–	0
Idaho	2	–	2	–	1	2	–	8	–	1
Montana	2	–	3	–	1	3	–	6	–	1
Northern Arizona	2	–	3	–	0	3	–	6	–	0
Idaho State	2	–	4	–	0	5	–	5	–	0
Weber State	1	–	5	–	0	4	–	7	–	0
$ – Conference champion; ^ – NCAA Division II playoff participant; Rankings from AP small college poll

The 1974 Idaho Vandals football team represented the University of Idaho in the 1974 NCAA Division I football season. The Vandals were led by first-year head coach Ed Troxel and were members of the Big Sky Conference, then in Division II for football. They played their home games at new Idaho Stadium, an unlit outdoor facility on campus in Moscow, Idaho.

Troxel was promoted to head coach in December 1973, after seven seasons at Idaho as an assistant under three head coaches, and several years as head coach of the track team. Before his move north to Moscow in 1967, he was very successful at the high school level at Borah in Boise. Troxel had previously declined the job in 1970 and days earlier in 1973, but was persuaded to reconsider by player support.

== Season ==
With quarterbacks Dave Comstock, Dennis Ballock, and Ken Schrom running the veer offense, the Vandals were 2–8–1 overall and 2–2–1 in the Big Sky.

In the Battle of the Palouse, Idaho suffered a seventh straight loss to neighbor Washington State of the Pac-8, falling 17–10 at Martin Stadium in Pullman on September 21. In the fourth game with new rival Boise State, the Vandals fell for the third time as the Broncos repeated as conference champions. Idaho did not schedule Northern Arizona until the following season and both played only five games in conference this year.

This was the last year the Vandals played outdoors on campus; its new Idaho Stadium opened in October 1971 in the same footprint as its predecessor, wooden Neale Stadium (1937–1968), and neither venue had lights. Artificial turf was installed in 1972; the 3M Tartan Turf was the first in the world produced in one continuous piece to allow it to be rolled up on a spool. Following this season, an arched roof and end walls were constructed in ten months to enclose it and the inaugural indoor game at the renamed Kibbie Dome was played on September 27, 1975.

== Notable players and coaches ==
Sophomore center John Yarno was a first-team AP All-American as a senior in 1976; he was selected in fourth round of the 1977 NFL draft and played six seasons with the Seattle Seahawks, the last five as a starter. Although quarterback Ken Schrom was projected as the starter for 1976 as a redshirt junior, he opted to pursue professional baseball after the 1976 baseball draft. A pitcher, he was a major leaguer for seven seasons and an all-star as a reliever in 1986.

Dennis Erickson, age 27, was in his first year as an offensive coordinator, and stayed for two seasons. He left for Fresno State and later San Jose State, then returned to the UI program in 1982 as head coach and the Vandals began a streak of fifteen consecutive winning seasons.

== Division I ==
Through 1977, the Big Sky was a Division II conference for football, except for Division I member Idaho, which moved down to I-AA in 1978. Idaho maintained its upper division status in the NCAA by playing Division I non-conference opponents (and was ineligible for the Division II postseason).

== Schedule ==
Date	Time	Opponent	Site	Result	Attendance	Source
September 14	12:30 pm	at Air Force*	Falcon Stadium; Colorado Springs, CO	L 0–37	32,364	
September 21	1:30 pm	at Washington State*	Martin Stadium; Pullman, WA (Battle of the Palouse)	L 10–17	19,300	
September 28	10:30 am	at Villanova*	Villanova Stadium; Villanova, PA	L 7–15	9,857	
October 5	7:00 pm	at Idaho State	ISU Minidome; Pocatello, ID	W 28–9	12,000	
October 12	1:30 pm	West Texas State*	Idaho Stadium; Moscow, ID	L 6–21	15,200	
October 19	1:30 pm	Montana^{†}	Idaho Stadium; Moscow, ID (Little Brown Stein)	T 35–35	16,500	
October 26	12:30 pm	at Montana State	Reno H. Sales Stadium; Bozeman, MT	L 21–36	6,117	
November 2	12:30 pm	Utah State*	Idaho Stadium; Moscow, ID	L 3–17	5,500	
November 9	12:30 pm	Weber State	Idaho Stadium; Moscow, ID	W 38–13	6,000	
November 16	11:30 am	at Northern Illinois*	Huskie Stadium; DeKalb, IL	L 21–27	3,712	
November 23	12:30 pm	at Boise State	Bronco Stadium; Boise, ID (rivalry)	L 29–53	14,486	
*Non-conference game; ^{†}Homecoming; All times are in Pacific time

== Roster ==
1974 Idaho Vandals football team roster
Players
Coaches
Offense

Pos.	#	Name	Class
QB	10	Ken Schrom	Fr
QB	12	Dennis Ballock	Sr
QB	14	Dave Comstock	Jr
FL	20	Kirk Dennis	Sr
TE	21	Joe Dahlin	Fr
RB	23	Monty Nash	So
FL	25	Collie Mack
RB	30	Mark Fredback (C)	Sr
RB	33	Marshall Brantley	So
RB		Robert Brooks	Fr
RB	42	Rob Dean
FB	44	J.C. Chadband	Jr
TE	45	Kevin McAfee	So
OL	50	Randy Dorn
C	56	John Yarno	So
RG	51	Mike Kramer	Jr
LT	62	John Adams	Jr
LG	65	Kurt Nelson	Sr
OL	68	Clarence Hough	So
OL	72	Scott Callahan
RT	78	Wil Overgaard	So
TE	82	Steve Duncanson	Jr
SE	83	Tim Coles	Jr

Defense

Pos.	#	Name	Class
FS, PK	11	Bill Keilty	Jr
FS	27	Chuck Love	Jr
CB	31	Bill Clark	So
S	37	Barry Hopkins	So
SS	38	Joe White (C)	Sr
CB	40	Johnny Sims	Jr
CB	43	Chris Mooney
LB	52	Kevin Robison
DT	53	Duke Minium	Sr
DE	55	Vince Howard	Sr
LB	58	Kjel Kiilsgaard	So
LB	59	John Kirtland	So
LB	61	Mike Siva	Jr
NG	63	Dave Gallick	Jr
NG	74	Jim Allen
DT	77	Craig Crnick	Jr
DE	81	Doug Fisher	Jr
DE	85	Chris Tormey	So
LB	87	Bill Kirtland
DE	88	Mark Hodges	Sr

Special teams

Pos.	#	Name	Class
PK, P	7	Steve Tanner
PK	16	Chuck Filippini	So

Head coach

- Ed Troxel (1st year)

Coordinators/assistant coaches

- Dennis Erickson (OC)
- Andy Christoff (DC)

Legend

- (C) Team captain
- (S) Suspended
- (I) Ineligible
- Injured
- Redshirt

== All-conference ==
Two Vandals were named to the Big Sky all-conference team: fullback J.C. Chadband and tight end Steve Duncanson.
