= 1974 Weber State Wildcats football team =

American college football season

1974 Weber State Wildcats football
- Conference: Big Sky Conference
- Record: 4–7 (1–5 Big Sky)
- Head coach: Dick Gwinn (2nd season)
- Home stadium: Wildcat Stadium

1974 Big Sky Conference football standings
	Conf.					Overall
Team	W		L		T	W		L		T
No. 5 Boise State $^	6	–	0	–	0	10	–	2	–	0
Montana State	4	–	2	–	0	7	–	3	–	0
Idaho	2	–	2	–	1	2	–	8	–	1
Montana	2	–	3	–	1	3	–	6	–	1
Northern Arizona	2	–	3	–	0	3	–	6	–	0
Idaho State	2	–	4	–	0	5	–	5	–	0
Weber State	1	–	5	–	0	4	–	7	–	0
$ – Conference champion; ^ – NCAA Division II playoff participant; Rankings from AP small college poll

The 1974 Weber State Wildcats football team represented Weber State College (now known as Weber State University) as a member of the Big Sky Conference during the 1974 NCAA Division II football season. Led by second-year head coach Dick Gwinn, the Wildcats compiled an overall record of 4–7, with a mark of 1–5 in conference play, and finished seventh in the Big Sky.

== Schedule ==
Date	Opponent	Site	Result	Attendance	Source
September 14	UNLV*	Wildcat Stadium; Ogden, UT	L 10–28	11,013	
September 21	Cal State Northridge*	Wildcat Stadium; Ogden, UT	W 28–0	8,369	
September 28	at Cal State Fullerton*	Santa Ana Stadium; Santa Ana, CA	W 31–21	2,145	
October 5	at Montana	Dornblaser Field; Missoula, MT	L 13–24	5,000	
October 12	Montana State	Wildcat Stadium; Ogden, UT	W 28–10	7,146	
October 19	at Northern Arizona	Lumberjack Stadium; Flagstaff, AZ	L 20–21	4,200	
October 26	Idaho State	Wildcat Stadium; Ogden, UT	L 8–10	7,126	
November 2	at No. 4 Boise State	Bronco Stadium; Boise, ID	L 14–42	13,252	
November 16	Eastern Michigan*	Wildcat Stadium; Ogden, UT	W 21–14	4,064	
November 9	at Idaho	Idaho Stadium; Moscow, ID	L 13–38	6,000	
November 23	at Utah State*	Romney Stadium; Logan, UT	L 7–20	9,744	
*Non-conference game; Rankings from AP Poll released prior to the game
