= Glenn Carano =

American football player and casino executive (born 1955)

No. 18
- Position: Quarterback

Personal information
- Born: November 18, 1955 (age 70); San Pedro, Los Angeles, California, U.S.
- Listed height: 6 ft 3 in (1.91 m)
- Listed weight: 201 lb (91 kg)

Career information
- High school: Wooster (Reno, Nevada)
- College: UNLV
- NFL draft: 1977: 2nd round, 54th overall pick

Career history
- Dallas Cowboys (1977–1983); Pittsburgh Maulers (1984)

Awards and highlights
- Super Bowl champion (XII)

Career NFL statistics
- Games played: 36
- Passing attempts: 57
- Passing completions: 21
- Completion percentage: 36.8%
- TD–INT: 3–1
- Passing yards: 304
- Passer rating: 65.2
- Stats at Pro Football Reference

Glenn Thomas Carano (born November 18, 1955) is an American former professional football player who was a quarterback for seven seasons with the Dallas Cowboys of the National Football League (NFL). He played college football for the UNLV Rebels and was selected in the second round of the 1977 NFL draft. Carano also was a member of the Pittsburgh Maulers of the United States Football League (USFL). After his playing career, he became the general manager of Eldorado Resorts properties of Circus Circus, Eldorado, and Silver Legacy Resort & Casino.

== Early life ==
Born in San Pedro, California, Carano's Pop Warner football coach was former NFL quarterback Eddie LeBaron. He graduated from Earl Wooster High School in Reno, Nevada, in 1973. He received high school All-American honors as a senior.

Carano accepted a football scholarship from University of Nevada, Las Vegas, where he became a four-year starter at quarterback for the Rebels. As a true freshman in 1973 under first-year head coach Ron Meyer, he was named the starter.

As a sophomore in 1974, Carano helped UNLV achieve a number two ranking in Division II, after they completed their one and only undefeated regular season. The Rebels met Delaware in the Grantland Rice Bowl, a national semifinal, but lost 49–11 to finish at 12–1. In the backfield with Carano was senior running back Mike Thomas, a fifth-round selection in the 1975 NFL draft and the offensive rookie of the year with the Washington Redskins. Carano finished with 49 completions out of 106 attempts, 839 passing yards, 11 touchdowns and 12 interceptions.

As a junior in 1975, he registered 128 completions out of 226 attempts, 2,039 passing yards, 13 touchdowns and 10 interceptions.

As a senior in 1976 under new head coach Tony Knap, Carano completed 148 of 277 passes for 2,024 yards, 13 touchdowns and 13 interceptions, while leading the Rebels to the Division II Midwest Regional (national quarterfinal) and a number seven national ranking. His twin brother Gene was his top receiver in his last season.

In his college career, Carano completed 337 of 636 passes for 5,095 yards, 37 passing touchdowns and 19 rushing touchdowns, while setting almost all of the school's passing records.

In 1989, he was inducted into the UNLV Athletics Hall of Fame. In 2015, he was inducted into the Southern Nevada Sports Hall of Fame.

== Professional career ==
=== Dallas Cowboys ===
In the 1977 NFL draft, the Dallas Cowboys did not have a second round draft choice, after trading three of them to the Seattle Seahawks as part of the package to acquire Tony Dorsett. On May 3, the Cowboys traded wide receiver Duke Fergerson to the Seahawks in exchange for the 26th position in the second round, used to select Carano. The Cowboys formerly only carried two quarterbacks on their roster until drafting Carano, who became the third-string quarterback after passing fellow rookie Steve DeBerg on the depth chart.

From 1977 to 1979, Carano was the third-string quarterback behind Roger Staubach and Danny White. In 1980, he became the backup after Staubach retired and White became the starter.

Carano is perhaps best remembered for replacing the injured White in the 1981 Thanksgiving game against the Chicago Bears and helping the Cowboys to a 10–9 comeback win. The next game was the only start of his NFL career, in which he completed 7 of 18 passes for 51 yards in a 37–13 win against the Baltimore Colts. Notably, the opposing quarterback for the Colts, David Humm, was also making his first and only NFL start, the only time in NFL history two "one and done" quarterbacks have ever faced off. Carano and Humm were the subjects of an NFL Films piece entitled "My One and Only," recounting the 1981 game; it noted that the two had been friends since high school (both played high school football in Nevada), and remained friends until Humm's death in 2018.

In 1982, Carano was passed on the depth chart by Gary Hogeboom for the backup quarterback role behind White.

=== Pittsburgh Maulers ===
On December 1, 1983, Carano signed with the Pittsburgh Maulers of the United States Football League where he completed 53.7% of his passes for 2,368 yards, 13 touchdowns and 19 interceptions in the 1984 season. The next year owner Edward J. DeBartolo, Sr. folded the team, after the USFL announced that they would be switching to a fall schedule in 1986.

== Personal life ==
Carano has served on the Nevada Athletic Commission, the Reno-Sparks Convention & Visitors Authority Marketing Committee, the Board of Directors for the Airport Authority of Washoe Country, and the Board of Directors for Boys & Girls Club of Truckee Meadows. He was married to Lamise and has three daughters, Kasey, Gina and Christi. Gina is a television personality, trailblazing mixed martial arts fighter, actress and fitness model. His father, Donald Louis "Don" Carano (October 17, 1931 – October 3, 2017), was an attorney and entrepreneur in Reno, Nevada.
