= 1974 Humboldt State Lumberjacks football team =

American college football season

1974 Humboldt State Lumberjacks football
- Conference: Far Western Conference
- Record: 4–6 (2–3 FWC)
- Head coach: Bud Van Deren (9th season)
- Home stadium: Redwood Bowl

1974 Far Western Conference football standings
	Conf.					Overall
Team	W		L		T	W		L		T
UC Davis $	5	–	0	–	0	9	–	1	–	0
San Francisco State	2	–	3	–	0	5	–	6	–	0
Humboldt State	2	–	3	–	0	4	–	6	–	0
Chico State	2	–	3	–	0	4	–	7	–	0
Cal State Hayward	2	–	3	–	0	3	–	6	–	0
Sacramento State	2	–	3	–	0	2	–	9	–	0
$ – Conference champion

The 1974 Humboldt State Lumberjacks football team represented Humboldt State University—now known as California State Polytechnic University, Humboldt—as a member of the Far Western Conference (FWC) during the 1974 NCAA Division II football season. Led by ninth-year head coach Bud Van Deren, the Lumberjacks compiled an overall record of 4–6 with a mark of 2–3 in conference play, placing in a five-way tie for second in the FWC. The team outscored its opponents 201 to 200 for the season. Humboldt State played home games at the Redwood Bowl in Arcata, California.

== Schedule ==
Date	Opponent	Site	Result	Attendance
September 14	Cal Lutheran*	Redwood Bowl; Arcata, CA	L 3–18	2,500
September 21	at Hawaii*	Honolulu Stadium; Honolulu, HI	L 9–35	18,555
September 28	Simon Fraser*	Redwood Bowl; Arcata, CA	L 3–35	5,000
October 5	Chico State	Redwood Bowl; Arcata, CA	L 28–31	2,000
October 12	Cal State Hayward	Redwood Bowl; Arcata, CA	L 20–28	2,800
October 19	at Sacramento State	Hornet Stadium; Sacramento, CA	W 23–6	3,900
October 26	at San Diego*	Torero Stadium; San Diego, CA	W 53–7	
November 2	at No. 12 UC Davis	Toomey Field; Davis, CA	L 7–14	7,500
November 9	San Francisco State	Redwood Bowl; Arcata, CA	W 16–12	4,200
November 16	at Puget Sound*	Baker Stadium; Tacoma, WA	W 39–14	3,950
*Non-conference game; Rankings from UPI Poll released prior to the game
