= 1974 Montana State Bobcats football team =

American college football season

1974 Montana State Bobcats football
- Conference: Big Sky Conference
- Record: 7–3 (4–2 Big Sky)
- Head coach: Sonny Holland (4th season)
- Offensive coordinator: Don Christensen (4th season)
- Defensive coordinator: Sonny Lubick (4th season)
- Home stadium: Sales Stadium

1974 Big Sky Conference football standings
	Conf.					Overall
Team	W		L		T	W		L		T
No. 5 Boise State $^	6	–	0	–	0	10	–	2	–	0
Montana State	4	–	2	–	0	7	–	3	–	0
Idaho	2	–	2	–	1	2	–	8	–	1
Montana	2	–	3	–	1	3	–	6	–	1
Northern Arizona	2	–	3	–	0	3	–	6	–	0
Idaho State	2	–	4	–	0	5	–	5	–	0
Weber State	1	–	5	–	0	4	–	7	–	0
$ – Conference champion; ^ – NCAA Division II playoff participant; Rankings from AP small college poll

The 1974 Montana State Bobcats football team was an American football team that represented Montana State University in the Big Sky Conference during the 1974 NCAA Division II football season. In their fourth season under head coach Sonny Holland, the Bobcats compiled a 7–4 record (4–2 against Big Sky opponents) and finished second in the Big Sky.

== Schedule ==
Date	Opponent	Site	Result	Attendance	Source
September 7	at Portland State*	Civic Stadium; Portland, OR	W 29–8	3,432	
September 14	at North Dakota*	Memorial Stadium; Grand Forks, ND	L 14–34	11,000	
September 21	at Fresno State*	Ratcliffe Stadium; Fresno, CA	W 14–7	9,987	
September 28	No. 3 Boise State	Sales Stadium; Bozeman, MT	L 37–40	9,100	
October 5	Northern Arizona	Sales Stadium; Bozeman, MT	W 44–21	5,500	
October 12	at Weber State	Wildcat Stadium; Ogden, UT	L 10–28	7,146	
October 19	Idaho State^{†}	Sales Stadium; Bozeman, MT	W 14–0	9,133	
October 26	Idaho	Sales Stadium; Bozeman, MT	W 36–21	6,117	
November 2	at Montana	Dornblaser Field; Missoula, MT (rivalry)	W 43–29	12,054–12,058	
November 16	North Dakota State*	Sales Stadium; Bozeman, MT	W 34–14	6,350–6,471	
*Non-conference game; ^{†}Homecoming; Rankings from AP Poll released prior to the game
