= UNLV Rebels football =

Athletic program of the University of Nevada

2026 UNLV Rebels football team
- First season: 1968; 58 years ago
- Athletic director: Erick Harper
- Head coach: Dan Mullen; 2nd season, 17–8 (.680)
- Location: Paradise, Nevada
- Stadium: Allegiant Stadium (capacity: 65,000)
- Field: Bill 'Wildcat' Morris Rebel Park
- NCAA division: Division I FBS
- Conference: Mountain West
- Colors: Scarlet and gray
- All-time record: 273–394–4 (.410)
- Bowl record: 4–3 (.571)

Conference championships
- Big West: 1994
- Consensus All-Americans: 1
- Rivalries: Nevada (rivalry); Hawaii (rivalry); San Jose State

Uniforms
- Nike
- Fight song: Win with the Rebels
- Mascot: No Mascot currently
- Marching band: Star of Nevada
- Website: unlvrebels.com

The UNLV Rebels football program is a college football team that represents the University of Nevada, Las Vegas (UNLV). The team is a member of the Mountain West Conference, which is a Division I Bowl Subdivision (formerly Division I-A) conference of the National Collegiate Athletic Association (NCAA). The program, which began on September 14, 1968, plays its home games at Allegiant Stadium in Paradise, Nevada.

== History ==
=== Early history ===
In 1967, Nevada Southern University announced that they would field a collegiate football program beginning on September 14, 1968, and announced that the team would be a Division II Independent and that Bill Ireland would be the program's first head coach. The Rebels played their first game of their inaugural season against the St. Mary's Gaels at Cashman Field in Las Vegas. The Rebels won the game, defeating the Gaels 27–20 in front of 8,000 fans. The Rebels remained undefeated until the last game of the season, losing to the Cal Lutheran Kingsmen, 13–17, as the Rebels finished their inaugural campaign 8–1. The following year, the Rebels played their first game against in-state rival Nevada, losing to the Wolf Pack 28–30. UNLV gained revenge, defeating Nevada the following year, 42–30, in the first year that the Fremont Cannon was awarded. On September 25, 1971, the Rebels played their first game against a Division I school, when they played Utah State of the Pacific Coast Athletic Association (PCAA), ultimately losing 7–27. On October 23, 1971, the Rebels opened their new home, Las Vegas Stadium, against Weber State, losing 17–30. At the end of the 1972 season with a disappointing 1–10 record, Ireland announced he was stepping down, leaving the Rebels with a 26–23–1 record.

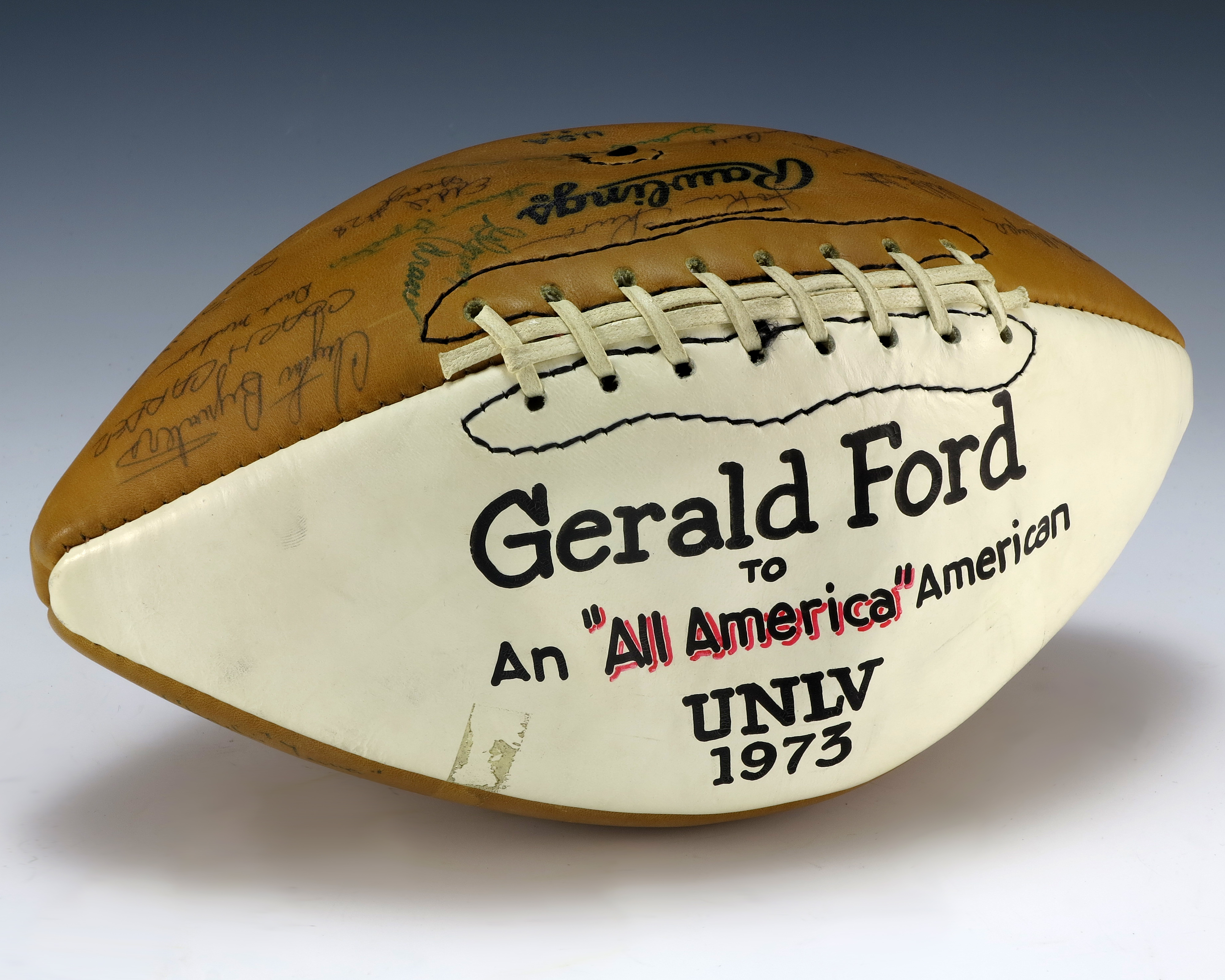
A football signed by the 1973 UNLV Runnin’ Rebels football team that was gifted to President Gerald Ford.

Ireland was replaced by Ron Meyer before the start of the 1973 season and Meyer led the Rebels back to powerhouse status with an 8–3 record, including their first victory over a major college opponent, thrashing Marshall 31–9. The Rebels continued their strong campaign, breaking the national Division II top-10 and announcing their first All-American, running back Mike Thomas, who ran for the Division II national rushing title with 1,741 and setting nine school records in the process. The Rebels' success continued in 1974 with the only undefeated season in school history, finishing 11–0 and ranking second in the national Division II polls, the highest any Rebels football team has ever placed. The Rebels embarked on their first post-season journey in a national quarterfinal against Alcorn State, defeating the Braves 35–22 in Las Vegas. The Rebels memorable season ended in the national semifinals in the Grantland Rice Bowl, losing to Delaware 11–49. Meyer left the program in 1976 to take the head coaching position at collegiate powerhouse SMU.

=== The move to Division I ===
Former Boise State coach Tony Knap took over the Rebels in 1976, after Ron Meyer's departure. Knap was able to continue the Rebels prior success under Meyer, with a 9–3 record, a ranking of 7th in the nation and a berth in the Division II playoffs, ultimately losing to Akron 6–27 in the national quarterfinals. After ten years as a Division II independent, the program made the jump to the Division I level in 1978, independent of any conference affiliation. On September 9, the Rebels played their first game as a Division I school, losing to Washington State 7–34. The Rebels defeated their first major college opponent away from Las Vegas, with a 33–6 victory over Colorado State in Fort Collins. At the end of the season, the Rebels made a trip to Yokohama, Japan, to compete against college football powerhouse Brigham Young, losing 28–24. Even with the hard end to the season, the Rebels still produced a memorable year, going 7–4 in their first campaign at the Division I level. The 1981 season proved to be the last in Knap's tenure at UNLV, as he retired from coaching after a year of accomplishments, including the Rebels' first appearance in the ABC's Regional Game of the Week (a 21–45 loss at Wyoming), a 45–41 upset of 8th-ranked BYU in Provo, Utah, and securing the programs 100th win (27–20 at UTEP) in El Paso, Texas.

The 1982 season was a big year in UNLV football history as the program hired its fourth head coach, Harvey Hyde and the Rebels became affiliated with a college athletic conference when they joined the Pacific Coast Athletic Association (PCAA). The Rebels' first PCAA game was a 27–29 loss to Pacific on October 2. It took the entire season before the Rebels won their first conference game, a 42–23 victory against Cal State Fullerton on November 27. The Rebels won their first conference championship in 1984 as the Randall Cunningham-led Rebels finished 11–2, including the program's first trip to a bowl game, a 30–13 victory over Toledo in the California Bowl in Fresno, California. Hyde stepped down after the 1985 season and a 5–5–1 record when the NCAA discovered that several players on the 1983 and 1984 Rebels were ineligible. The Rebels were forced to forfeit their entire 1983 and 1984 seasons, including the California Bowl.

Wayne Nunnely became the program's fifth head coach on September 20, 1986, and he coached the Rebels to a 17–7 victory over Wisconsin in front of the first sellout crowd in Silver Bowl Stadium history, a then record 32,207 fans. One of Nunnely's key players was Elbert "Ickey" Woods, the first Rebel and PCAA running back to win the national Division I rushing title, as he rushed for 1,658 yards and was drafted by the Cincinnati Bengals in the 1988 NFL draft.

1994 was another memorable season for the Rebels, as wide receiver Randy Gatewood set two single-game receiving records in a 38–48 loss to Idaho on September 17. The Rebels then stunned the heavily favored Nevada, 32–27 to win a share of the Big West Conference championship, the program's second title (but the first one they were allowed to keep). The Rebels then defeated Central Michigan 52–24 in the Las Vegas Bowl on their home field.

In 1996, the Rebels along with San Jose State left the Big West Conference and became a member of the heavily expanded Western Athletic Conference. The league announced that it would hold a championship game for the top team in each of the two divisions at the end of each season and that the game would be held at Sam Boyd Stadium in Las Vegas. The Rebels lost their first WAC game, 65–17 to Air Force on September 7. The Rebels finally won their first WAC game in a 44–42 shootout against San Diego State on November 16, in a game in which freshman quarterback John Denton set an NCAA freshman record for passing yards with 503. Although the Rebels finished 1–11, Denton still set ten NCAA freshman records. On October 17, 1998, UNLV played their first overtime game, losing to San Diego State 17–20. In 1999, the Rebels finished with the program's first winless season, but had their first consensus First Team All-American in punter Joe Kristosik, who averaged a nationally best 46.2 yard per punt average.

=== 1999–present ===
In 1999, the Rebels left the WAC with seven other schools to form the Mountain West Conference, and announcing that the program had hired collegiate and professional coach John Robinson as their eighth head coach. The school lost their conference opener on September 25, 14–52, to Utah, and won its first Mountain West victory on October 9, 35–32, over Wyoming. In week two, the team trailed Baylor 24–21 with ten seconds remaining and no timeouts left. Opting to run the ball rather than take a knee, Baylor's offense fumbled, allowing UNLV's Kevin Thomas to recover and return the ball 99 yards for a touchdown and a dramatic 27–24 Rebel victory. In 2000, the Rebels started by upsetting undefeated Air Force 34–13 on September 30, in the first time that ABC came to Las Vegas for a Rebels football game. The Rebels then ended a five-game skid to rival Nevada, defeating the Wolf Pack 34–13 in front of the largest crowd to see a game in the Battle for Nevada. The season went down to the wire as the Rebels had to pull out a 34–32 victory on the road against Hawaii to clinch their third berth in a bowl game. The Rebels were chosen as the Mountain West representative for the Las Vegas Bowl on December 20. The Rebels would continue their undefeated streak in bowl games as they defeated Arkansas 31–14 in front of a Las Vegas Bowl record 29,113 fans. They finished the season 8–5.

Before the 2001 season, the Rebels were ranked No. 25 in Sports Illustrated's preseason Top 25 and No. 24 in Football Digest's rankings. Quarterback Jason Thomas was named a candidate for the Heisman Trophy, ranking as high as No. 7. Although the Rebels seemed good on paper, the team did not gel and ended the season a disappointing 4–7. On October 5, 2002, the Rebels defeated rival Nevada 21–17 for Robinson's 200th career coaching victory. Robinson retired after the 2004 season, having led the Rebels to a bowl game and five consecutive victories over rival Nevada.

On December 6, 2004, the Rebels hired Utah assistant coach Mike Sanford as the ninth head coach. In his first three years, Sanford failed to win more than two games and had back-to-back 2–10 seasons, finishing last in the Mountain West all three years. Sanford failed to beat Nevada all five years he coached at UNLV. Still, the program sent former Rebels Eric Wright and Beau Bell to the NFL draft.

The Rebels finished the 2008 season with a 5–7 record after starting the season 3–1. This was the best win–loss record UNLV had since going 6–6 in 2003. It also marked the first time UNLV did not finish last in their division since 2004. Their 23–20 victory over No. 15 Arizona State was the first time the Rebels had beaten a ranked opponent since 2003.

The 2009 season led to Sanford's dismissal as coach. UNLV was picked to finish fifth in the conference, but the team began to fall apart after a surprising loss at Wyoming. That was followed by losses at Nevada, against Brigham Young and Utah, and at Texas Christian and the Air Force Academy — games in which UNLV was outscored 243–81. They rebounded toward the end of the season and finished 5–7.

After the Air Force loss on November 14, the school announced Sanford's last game as coach would be the season finale against San Diego State. Former Montana head coach Bobby Hauck was named as the 10th head coach on December 21, 2009. Former TCU, Alabama and Texas A&M head coach Dennis Franchione was also interviewed for the position.

Before the 2014 Nevada Wolf Pack game, Bobby Hauck announced that he would be stepping down after the 2014 season. On December 10, 2014, the school announced that Tony Sanchez of Bishop Gorman High School would succeed Hauck as the 11th head coach of UNLV.

Sanchez announced his completed staff at UNLV on December 22, 2014, which would feature staff members from Nebraska, Colorado, Oregon State, USC, Houston, Georgia State and Bishop Gorman.

In 2016, a new domed stadium was proposed and approved for Las Vegas that would be the home to the Las Vegas Raiders of the National Football League (NFL) after the team moved to Las Vegas from Oakland and the Rebels accomplishing UNLV's goal of replacing Sam Boyd Stadium. UNLV had been trying to get Sam Boyd Stadium replaced with a new facility since 2011 but had not found the funding to do so.

On September 2, 2017, the UNLV Rebels lost to the Howard University Bison 40–43 in Sam Boyd Stadium. Howard, a MEAC FCS opponent, was coached by Mike London, and led at quarterback by freshman Caylin Newton, younger brother of NFL star Cam Newton. As of September 2017, due to high off-shore point spread numbers, Howard's victory against UNLV is the biggest point spread upset in college football history.

On November 23, 2019, the UNLV Rebels defeated the San Jose State Spartans in their final home game at Sam Boyd Stadium, 38–35, in front of 17,373 fans in attendance.

On November 25, 2019, Tony Sanchez and UNLV agreed to part ways, taking effect after the team's final regular season game. He was replaced by Oregon offensive coordinator Marcus Arroyo who was announced as the new head coach of the Rebel football program on December 11, 2019.

On October 31, 2020, the Rebels opened their new home, Allegiant Stadium, against Nevada, losing 37–19.

== Conference affiliations ==
- NCAA College Division independent (1968–1972)
- NCAA Division II independent (1973–1977)
- NCAA Division I-A independent (1978–1981)
- Big West Conference (1982–1995)
  - Pacific Coast Athletic Association (1982–1987)
  - Big West Conference (1988–1995)
- Western Athletic Conference (1996–1998)
- Mountain West Conference (1999–present)

== Conference championships ==
UNLV has won two conference championships, with one forfeit. Their 1984 Big West Conference title was forfeited due to using ineligible players.

Year	Conference	Coach	Overall Record	Conference Record
1984†	Pacific Coast Athletic Conference	Harvey Hyde	11–2	5–2
1994	Big West Conference	Jeff Horton	7–5	5–1

† Forfeited due to ineligible players.

== Bowl games ==
UNLV has played in seven officially sanctioned bowl games, with six of them being in Division I (FBS) and one being in Division II. The Rebels have an official bowl record of 3–3 due to the subsequent forfeit of the 1984 California Bowl win due to NCAA sanctions on ineligible players.

Date	Bowl	Opponent	Result
December 7, 1974	Grantland Rice Bowl	Delaware	L 11–49
December 15, 1984	California Bowl	Toledo	W 30–13†
December 15, 1994	Las Vegas Bowl	Central Michigan	W 52–24
December 21, 2000	Las Vegas Bowl	Arkansas	W 31–14
January 1, 2014	Heart of Dallas Bowl	North Texas	L 14–36
December 26, 2023	Guaranteed Rate Bowl	Kansas	L 36–49
December 18, 2024	LA Bowl	California	W 24–13
December 23, 2025	Frisco Bowl	Ohio	L 10–17

† forfeited

UNLV traveled to Yokohama, Japan, and played in front of 27,500 spectators at Yokohama Stadium in the 1978 Nikkan Yokohama Bowl on December 2, 1978, against the BYU Cougars in a game that is not officially recognized as an NCAA bowl game.

== Playoff appearances ==
=== NCAA Division II ===
The Rebels made two appearances in the NCAA Division II playoffs. They had a combined record of 1–2.

Year	Round	Opponent	Result
1974	Quarterfinals; Semifinals	Alcorn State; Delaware	W, 35–22; L, 11–49
1976	Quarterfinals	Akron	L, 6–27

== Head coaches ==
UNLV has had 14 head coaches in 58 years of college football. Four of them (Harvey Hyde, Jeff Horton, John Robinson, and Barry Odom) have won Conference Coach of the Year awards.

Coach	Years	Seasons	Record	Pct.	Bowl Record	Playoff Record
Bill Ireland	1968–1972	5	26–23–1	.530		
Ron Meyer	1973–1975	3	27–8–0	.771		1-1
Tony Knap	1976–1981	6	47–20–2	.696		0–1
Harvey Hyde	1982–1985	4	8–19–1 (Note: On field record was 26–19–1 prior to NCAA sanctions.)	.304 (Note: On field percentage was .576 prior to NCAA sanctions.)	0–0	
Wayne Nunnely	1986–1989	4	19–25–0	.432		
Jim Strong	1990–1993	4	17–27–0	.386		
Jeff Horton	1994–1998	5	13–44–0	.228	1–0	
John Robinson	1999–2004	6	28–42	.400	1–0	
Mike Sanford	2005–2009	5	16–43	.271		
Bobby Hauck	2010–2014	5	15–49	.234	0–1	
Tony Sanchez	2015–2019	5	20–40	.333		
Marcus Arroyo	2020–2022	3	7–23	.233		
Barry Odom	2023–2024	2	19–8	.704	0–1	
Dan Mullen	2025–present	2	17–8	.680		

== Rivalries ==
=== Nevada ===
The Battle for Nevada

UNR leads the series 28–23 as of the conclusion of the 2025 season.

=== Hawai'i ===
Ninth Island Showdown

Beginning in 2017, the annual game between UNLV and Hawai'i, "Ninth Island Showdown" or, "The Battle for the Golden Pineapple" gained a rivalry trophy when the California Hotel and Casino donated the "Golden Pineapple" to the winner of the game. Las Vegas has long been a popular destination for Hawaiians for both pleasure and relocation, so much so that it has been dubbed "the Ninth Island", with the Cal Hotel in particular aggressively marketing itself to Hawaiian tourists. Hawai'i is one of UNLV's two protected Mountain West Conference rivalries (along with Nevada) when the conference shifted to one division in 2023, meaning they will play every year. The 'Bows lead the all-time series between the two schools 19–17 as of 2026.

=== San Jose State ===
The Friendly Rivalry

San Jose State leads the series 20-9-1 as of conclusion of the 2026 season. The rivalry stems back to the days when both the San Jose State Spartans and the UNLV Rebels athletics programs were both in the Big West Conference, in the 1980s. In the mid-1990's the Spartans and Rebels were both a part of WAC, Western Athletic Conference, and are division rivals in the Mountain West today. Recently dubbed 'A Friendly Rivalry' by some media in 2022 for the close friendly relationship ex-Rebels Head Coach Marcus Arroyo and Spartans Head Coach Brent Brennan have.

== Retired numbers ==
The Rebels has only retired one single number.

UNLV Rebels retired numbers
No.	Player	Pos.	Tenure	No. ret.	Ref.
12	Randall Cunningham	QB/P	1981–1984	1984	

== College Football Hall of Fame ==
Name	Years	Position	Inducted	Ref
John Robinson	1999-2004	Head coach	2009	
Randall Cunningham	1982-1984	Punter/QB	2016	

John Robinson is mostly known for his 6 Rose Bowl victories and 4 National Championships while at USC. In 1999 Robinson was hired to coach football at the University of Nevada, Las Vegas. After a 2–0 start in 1999, the second win coming at Baylor, Robinson's first UNLV team finished only 3–8. The Rebels rebounded to win eight games in 2000, including a 31–14 victory over Arkansas in the Las Vegas Bowl, Robinson's only bowl appearance with the Running Rebels. In 2002, Robinson was chosen as the university's athletic director, but he stepped down from that position a year later to concentrate on the coaching position. In 2003, he was inducted into the Rose Bowl Hall of Fame.

Randall Cunningham was a 1983 and 1984 College Football All-America Team selection as a punter. In 1984, his senior year, he led the Rebels to an 11–2 season (adjusted to 0–13 when it was found out several players were ineligible).

== National and Conference Awards ==
=== National ===
HERO Sports G5 Special Teams Player of the Year

Award	Name	Year	Position	Ref
G5 Special Teams Player of the Yearr	Ricky White III	2024	WR / PR/ KR	

College Football Network Freshman Specialist of the Year

Award	Name	Year	Position	Ref
Freshman Specialist of the Year	Caden Chittenden	2024	K	

=== Conference ===
Pacific Coast Athletic Association

Award	Name	Year	Position	Ref
Coach of the Year	Harvey Hyde	1984	Coach	
Offensive Player of the Year	Randall Cunningham	1983	Punter/QB	
Offensive Player of the Year	Randall Cunningham	1984	Punter/QB	
Offensive Player of the Year	Ickey Woods	1987	RB	
Co-Defenesive Player of the Year	Aaron Moog	1984	DE	

Big West Conference

Award	Name	Year	Position	Ref
Co-Coach of the Year	Jeff Horton	1994	Coach	

Western Athletic Conference

Award	Name	Year	Position	Ref
Freshman of the Year	Jon Denton	1996	QB	
Freshman of the Year	James Sunia	1998	MLB	

Mountain West Conference

Award	Name	Year	Position	Ref
Co-Coach of the Year	John Robinson	2000	Coach	
Coach of the Year	Barry Odom	2023	Coach	
Freshman of the Year	Dominique Dorsey	2001	RB	
Freshman of the Year	Ryan Wolfe	2006	WR	
Freshman of the Year	Devonte Boyd	2014	WR	
Freshman of the Year	Armani Rogers	2017	QB	
Freshman of the Year	Kyle Williams	2020	WR	
Freshman of the Year	Cameron Friel	2021	QB	
Freshman of the Year	Jayden Maiava	2023	QB	
Defensive Player of the Year	Kevin Thomas	2001	CB	
Defensive Player of the Year	Jamaal Brimmer	2002	S	
Defensive Player of the Year	Jamaal Brimmer	2003	S	
Defensive Player of the Year	Beau Bell	2007	LB	
Defensive Player of the Year	Jackson Woodard	2024	LB	
Special Teams Player of the Year	Jose Pizano	2023	K	
Special Teams Player of the Year	Ricky White III	2024	KR/ PR	

=== Mountain West Conference 25th Anniversary Team ===
Name	Years	Position	Ref
Ryan Wolfe	2006 - 2010	WR	
Kevin Thomas	1999 - 2002	CB	
Jamaal Brimmer	2001 - 2004	S	

=== All-Americans ===
UNLV has had 2- Consensus 1st Team All-American, 10- 1st Team, 9- 2nd Team, 5- 3rd Team, 1- 4th Team, 3- Honorable Mention, 1- Academic All-American and 6- Freshman All-American, in program history as of the end of the 2024 season.

Name	Year	Position	Team	Ref
Mike Thomas	1973	RB	1st	
Mike Thomas	1974	RB	1st	
Joe Ingersoll	1974	DL	1st	
Joe Ingersoll	1975	DL	2nd	
Jim Sandusky	1981	WR	AP 2nd	
Randall Cunningham	1983	Punter	1st	
Randall Cunningham	1984	Punter	2nd	
Randall Cunningham	1984	QB	Honorable Mention	
Joe Kristosik	1998	Punter	Consensus 1st	
Brian Parvin	1992	Punter	2nd	
Brad Faunce	1993	Punter	2nd/3rd	
James Sunia	1998	MLB	Freshman 1st	
Ray Cheetany	2000	Punter	1st	
Kevin Thomas	2000	CB	2nd	
Kevin Thomas	2001	CB	3rd/ 4th	
Jamaal Brimmer	2003	S	1st	
Jamaal Brimmer	2004	S	2nd/ 3rd	
Ryan Wolfe	2006	WR	Freshman 2nd	
Matt Murphy	2007	OL	Freshman 2nd	
Devonte Boyd	2014	WR	Freshman 1st	
Kyle Williams	2020	WR	Freshman 1st	
Charles Williams	2021	RB	2nd Academic	
Rex Goossen	2022	LS	2nd	
Austin Ajiake	2022	LB	Honorable Mention	
Daniel Gutierrez	2022	K	Honorable Mention	
Ricky White III	2023	WR	AP 3rd	
Caden Chittenden	2024	K	CFN Freshman 1st	
Ricky White III	2024	WR	PS 3rd Team, HERO Sports G5 1st	
Jackson Woodard	2024	LB	PS 2nd Team, HERO Sports G5 1st	
Jalen Catalon	2024	DB	PS HM, HERO Sports G5 1st	
Tiger Shanks	2024	OL	PS HM	
Jacob De Jesus	2024	RS	HERO Sports G5 3rd	

== Individual school records ==
=== Rushing records ===
- Most rushing attempts, career: 769, Tim Cornett (2010–13)
- Most rushing attempts, season: 274, Mike Thomas (1973)
- Shortest route to 100 yards, 4 attempts Shaquille Murray-Lawrence (August 29, 2013) vs. Minnesota Gophers
- Most rushing attempts, game: 37, Ickey Woods (November 7, 1987) vs. Long Beach State and (November 21, 1987) vs. Pacific
- Most rushing yards, career: 4,201, Charles Williams (2016–21)
- Most rushing yards, season: 1,741, Mike Thomas (1973)
- Most rushing yards, game: 314, Mike Thomas (November 3, 1973) vs. Santa Clara
- Most rushing touchdowns, career: 40, Lexington Thomas (2015–18)
- Most rushing touchdowns, season: 20, Mike Thomas (1973)
- Most rushing touchdowns, game: 4, 5 times, most recently by Jai'Den Thomas (September 23, 2023) vs. UTEP
- Longest run from scrimmage: 91 yards (83 m), Dalton Sneed (October 1, 2016, vs. Fresno State)
- Most games with at least 100 rushing yards, career: 18, Lexington Thomas (2015–2018)
- Most games with at least 100 rushing yards, season: 9, Ickey Woods (1987) and Mike Thomas (1973)
- Most games with at least 200 rushing yards, career: 5, Mike Thomas (1973–74)
- Most games with at least 200 rushing yards, season: 3, Ickey Woods (1987) and Mike Thomas (1973)

=== Passing records ===
- Most passing attempts, career: 1,029, Randall Cunningham (1982–84)
- Most passing attempts, season: 506, Jon Denton (1996)
- Most passing attempts, game: 61, Jon Denton (November 23, 1996, at San Jose State)
- Most passing completions, career: 596, Randall Cunningham (1982–84)
- Most passing completions, season: 277, Jon Denton (1996)
- Most passing completions, game: 35, Nick Sherry (August 29, 2013, at Minnesota)
- Most passing yards, career: 8,020, Randall Cunningham (1982–84)
- Most passing yards, season: 3,778, Sam King (1981)
- Most passing yards, game: 503, Jon Denton (November 16, 1996, vs. San Diego State)
- Most passing touchdowns, career: 59, Randall Cunningham (1982–84)
- Most passing touchdowns, season: 25, Jon Denton (1996)
- Most passing touchdowns, game: 5, 4 times, most recently by Caleb Herring (November 30, 2013, vs San Diego State)
- Longest pass completion: 94 yards (86 m), Armani Rogers to Devonte Boyd (September 9, 2017, vs. Idaho)
- Most games with at least 200 passing yards, career: 24, Randall Cunningham (1982–84)
- Most games with at least 200 passing yards, season: 11, Sam King (1981)
- Most games with at least 300 passing yards, career: 9, Jon Denton (1996–97)
- Most games with at least 300 passing yards, season: 6, Sam King (1981)

=== Receiving records ===
- Most receptions, career: 187, Ryan Wolfe (2006–09)
- Most receptions, season: 88, Ricky White III (2023), Ryan Wolfe (2008) and Randy Gatewood (1994)
- Most receptions, game: 23, Randy Gatewood (September 17, 1994, vs. Idaho) (also an NCAA record)
- Most receiving yards, career: 3,495, Ryan Wolfe (2006–09)
- Most receiving yards, season: 1,483, Ricky White III (2023)
- Most receiving yards, game: 363, Randy Gatewood (September 17, 1994, vs. Idaho)
- Most touchdown receptions, career: 26, Phillip Payne (2008–11)
- Most touchdown receptions, season: 14, Devante Davis (2013)
- Most touchdown receptions, game: 4, Tyleek Collins (October 27, 2018, vs. San Jose State), Devante Davis (November 30, 2013 vs. San Diego State), Henry Bailey (September 17, 1994, vs. Idaho) and Nathaniel Hawkins (October 30, 1971, vs. New Mexico Highlands)
- Most games with at least 100 receiving yards, career: 14, Devonte Boyd (2014–17)
- Most games with at least 100 receiving yards, season: 8, Jim Sandusky (1981)

== Rebels in the pros ==
- Isaako Aaitui – Nose tackle
- Waymon Alridge – Canadian Football League player
- Shaquille Murray-Lawrence -Canadian Football League
- Johan Asiata – Offensive lineman
- Jaden Bradley – Wide receiver
- Glenn Carano – Quarterback
- Hunkie Cooper – Wide receiver/defensive back, an Arena Football League Hall of Famer.
- Randall Cunningham – Quarterback
- Randy Gatewood – Wide receiver
- Joe Hawley – Center
- Rocky Hinds – Quarterback
- Robert Jackson – cornerback Cleveland Browns
- Carlton Johnson – Arena Football League player
- Suge Knight – Defensive end, better known as co-founder and CEO of Death Row Records
- Admiral Dewey Larry – USFL and CFL player
- George J. Maloof, Jr. – cornerback, better known as a casino mogul
- Kenny Mayne – Quarterback, better known as an ESPN SportsCenter anchor
- Rodney Mazion – American football and baseball player
- Keenan McCardell – Wide receiver
- Torry McTyer – cornerback Cincinnati Bengals
- Adam Seward – Linebacker
- Tiger Shanks – Canadian Football League player
- Bob Stockham – Arena Football League player
- Frank Summers – Fullback
- Ricky White III – Wide receiver
- Doc Wise – Arena Football League player
- Ickey Woods – Running back
- Eric Wright – Cornerback

== Future non-conference opponents ==
Announced schedules as of November 10, 2026.

2027	2028	2029	2030	2031	2032	2033
Colorado State	at Colorado State	at Memphis	James Madison	at UCLA	Miami (OH)	Sam Houston
at USC	Houston	UTSA	at Iowa State			
Arizona State	at Washington					
at James Madison						
