= 1974 UNLV Rebels football team =

American college football season

1974 UNLV Rebels football

Grantland Rice Bowl, L 11–49 vs. Delaware
- Conference: Independent
- Record: 12–1
- Head coach: Ron Meyer (2nd season)
- Offensive coordinator: Larry Kennan (2nd season)
- Defensive coordinator: Steve Sidwell (1st season)
- Captains: Scott Orr; Mike Thomas; Mike Whitemaine; Terryl Thomas
- Home stadium: Las Vegas Stadium

1974 NCAA Division II independents football records
	Conf.			Overall
Team	W	L	T	W		L		T
No. 1 Central Michigan ^		–		12	–	1	–	0
No. 6 UNLV ^		–		12	–	1	–	0
No. 4 Delaware ^		–		12	–	2	–	0
No. 8 Western Carolina ^		–		9	–	2	–	0
No. 9 Tennessee State		–		8	–	2	–	0
No. 12 Youngstown State ^		–		8	–	2	–	0
Santa Clara		–		7	–	3	–	0
Wayne State (MI)		–		7	–	3	–	0
Ball State		–		6	–	4	–	0
Kentucky State		–		6	–	4	–	0
Northeastern		–		6	–	4	–	0
Central State (OH)		–		6	–	5	–	0
Akron		–		5	–	5	–	0
Illinois College		–		4	–	4	–	0
Indiana State		–		5	–	5	–	0
Nevada		–		5	–	6	–	0
Portland State		–		5	–	6	–	0
American International		–		4	–	5	–	0
Eastern Michigan		–		4	–	6	–	1
Milwaukee		–		4	–	6	–	0
Northeast Louisiana		–		4	–	6	–	0
Eastern Illinois		–		3	–	6	–	1
Arkansas–Pine Bluff		–		3	–	5	–	0
Chattanooga		–		4	–	7	–	0
Nebraska–Omaha		–		3	–	7	–	0
Bucknell		–		2	–	8	–	0
Northern Michigan		–		0	–	10	–	0
^ – NCAA Division II playoff participant; Rankings from AP small college poll

The 1974 UNLV Rebels football team was an American football team that represented the University of Nevada, Las Vegas as an independent during the 1974 NCAA Division II football season. In their second year under head coach Ron Meyer, the Rebels won all eleven games in the regular season and were invited to the eight-team Division II playoffs. They advanced to the semifinals (Grantland Rice Bowl), and ended the year with a 12–1 record.

== Schedule ==
Date	Opponent	Rank	Site	Result	Attendance	Source
September 14	at Weber State		Wildcat Stadium; Ogden, UT	W 28–10	11,013	
September 21	at Northern Arizona	No. 10	Lumberjack Stadium; Flagstaff, AZ	W 31–14	7,800	
September 28	Montana	No. 7	Las Vegas Stadium; Whitney, NV	W 20–17	11,524–11,544	
October 5	Santa Clara	No. 8	Las Vegas Stadium; Whitney, NV	W 51–19	11,112	
October 12	Prairie View A&M	No. 6	Las Vegas Stadium; Whitney, NV	W 63–28	8,915	
October 19	No. 4 Boise State	No. 5	Las Vegas Stadium; Whitney, NV	W 37–35	18,631	
October 26	Hawaii	No. 3	Las Vegas Stadium; Whitney, NV	W 33–8	15,418	
November 2	New Mexico Highlands	No. 2	Las Vegas Stadium; Whitney, NV	W 52–14	5,587	
November 9	South Dakota State	No. 2	Las Vegas Stadium; Whitney, NV	W 24–21	9,672	
November 16	Nevada^{†}	No. 2	Las Vegas Stadium; Whitney, NV (Fremont Cannon)	W 28–7	17,119–17,200	
November 23	Idaho State	No. 2	Las Vegas Stadium; Whitney, NV	W 31–7	8,654	
November 30	No. 12 Alcorn State	No. 2	Las Vegas Stadium; Whitney, NV (NCAA Division II Quarterfinal)	W 35–22	12,689	
December 7	vs. No. 3 Delaware	No. 2	Tiger Stadium; Baton Rouge, LA (Grantland Rice Bowl—NCAA Division II Semifinal)	L 11–49	10,000	
^{†}Homecoming; Rankings from AP Poll released prior to the game

== NFL draft ==
Running back Mike Thomas was selected 108th overall in the fifth round of the 1975 NFL draft by the Washington Redskins, and was the NFC Rookie of the Year in 1975.
