= Pete Yoder =

American football coach

Biographical details
- Born: March 5, 1940; Elkhart, Indiana
- Died: January 30, 2006 (aged 65); Austin Texas, U.S.
- Education: Long Beach State

Coaching career (HC unless noted)
- 1963–1964: Long Beach Poly HS (OB)
- 1965–1969: Blair HS (CA)
- 1970–1971: USC (RB)
- 1972–1974: Cal State Fullerton
- 1975–1985: Esperanza HS (CA)

Head coaching record
- Overall: 18–15 (college); 136–47–4 (high school)

Accomplishments and honors

Championships
- 2 CIF Southern Section (4-A Division 1969, Central Conference 1979)

Peter Lampman Yoder (March 5, 1940 – January 30, 2006) was an American football coach. A native of Elkhart, Indiana, Yoder moved with his family to Southern California at an early age, settling in the city of Downey. At Downey High School, Yoder became a star quarterback, helping the Vikings to earn back-to-back CIF Southern Section Central Group titles in 1956 and 1957 while earning all-league and all-CIF honors. Following high school, Yoder initially enrolled at the University of Notre Dame, but later withdrew and pursued a bachelor's degree and teaching credential at Long Beach State University.

== Coaching career ==
Upon graduation, Yoder got his first job teaching social studies and serving as an assistant football coach at Long Beach Poly High School. After two years there, he was hired as a physical education teacher and varsity football head coach at Blair High School in Pasadena, California. Following a winless season in 1965 during which he guided a team with no seniors, Yoder's Vikings rebounded by going 10-1 his second year, reaching the CIF-SS 4-A Division quarterfinal. Three years later, Blair completed an undefeated season by beating Bishop Amat 28-27 in the 4-A Division championship game. That 13-0 team featured "The Blair Pair" of running backs Jim McAlister and Kermit Johnson which scored 580 points—nearly 45 points a game.

Yoder then left Blair High School in 1970 to serve as a running backs coach at the University of Southern California (USC) under head coach John McKay. After two seasons with the Trojans, Yoder accepted the head coaching position at California State University, Fullerton, where he compiled an 18–15 record in three seasons (1972–1974).

Returning to the high school level, Yoder became varsity football head coach at Esperanza High School in Anaheim, California, while also teaching PE and history. Under Yoder's leadership, the Aztecs made the CIF playoffs for the first time and would go on to reach the postseason in every season that Yoder coached them. In 1979, Yoder earned his second CIF Southern Section football championship as he led Esperanza to an 11-3 record that ended with a 14-7 win over San Clemente to clinch the Central Conference title. Yoder's Esperanza teams would finish as conference runners-up in 1980, 1982, and 1984, and he stepped down following the 1985 season with an 11-year record of 99 wins, 34 losses, and four ties.

Yoder never coached again and continued his career in education as an administrator in the Tustin Unified School District before retiring in 1999. He died of brain cancer on January 30, 2006, in Austin, Texas.

== Head coaching record ==
=== College ===
Year	Team	Overall	Conference	Standing	Bowl/playoffs
Cal State Fullerton Titans (California Collegiate Athletic Association) (1972–1973)
1972	Cal State Fullerton	7–4	2–2	3rd	
1973	Cal State Fullerton	7–4	1–3	T–3rd	
Cal State Fullerton Titans (Pacific Coast Athletic Association) (1974)
1974	Cal State Fullerton	4–7	0–0	NA	
Cal State Fullerton:		18–15	3–5		
Total:		18–15			

=== High School ===
Year	Team	Regular Season					Postseason
Year	Team	Won	Lost	Ties	Win %	Finish	Result
1965	Blair	0	9	0	.000	8th in Foothill League	did not qualify
1966	Blair	10	1	0	.909	1st in Foothill League	CIF-SS 4-A Division Quarterfinalists
1967	Blair	7	2	0	.778	T-2nd in Foothill League	did not qualify
1968	Blair	7	1	1	.833	2nd in Foothill League	did not qualify
1969	Blair	13	0	0	1.000	1st in Foothill League	CIF-SS 4-A Division Champions
Blair Total		37	13	1	.735		
1975	Esperanza	6	4	0	.600	3rd in Orange League	CIF-SS 2-A Division First Round
1976	Esperanza	9	2	1	.792	2nd in Orange League	CIF-SS 2-A Division Quarterfinalists
1977	Esperanza	7	3	2	.667	3rd in Orange League	CIF-SS Central Conference Semifinalists
1978	Esperanza	9	1	0	.900	1st in Orange League	CIF-SS Central Conference First Round
1979	Esperanza	11	3	0	.786	2nd Orange League	CIF-SS Central Conference Champions
1980	Esperanza	13	1	0	.929	1st in Orange League	CIF-SS Central Conference Finalists
1981	Esperanza	9	4	0	.692	T-3rd in Empire League	CIF-SS Southern Conference Semifinalists
1982	Esperanza	12	2	0	.857	1st in Empire League	CIF-SS Southern Conference Finalists
1983	Esperanza	6	6	1	.500	3rd in Empire League	CIF-SS Southern Conference Semifinalists
1984	Esperanza	12	2	0	.857	1st in Empire League	CIF-SS Southern Conference Finalists
1985	Esperanza	5	6	0	.455	3rd in Empire League	CIF-SS Southern Conference First Round
Esperanza Total		99	34	4	.531		
Total		136	47	5	.737		
