= Mike Thomas (running back) =

American football player (1953–2019)

No. 22
- Position: Running back

Personal information
- Born: July 17, 1953; Greenville, Texas, U.S.
- Died: August 23, 2019 (aged 66); Houston, Texas, U.S.
- Listed height: 5 ft 11 in (1.80 m)
- Listed weight: 190 lb (86 kg)

Career information
- High school: Greenville
- College: Oklahoma, UNLV
- NFL draft: 1975: 5th round, 108th overall pick

Career history
- Washington Redskins (1975–1978); San Diego Chargers (1979–1980)

Awards and highlights
- NFL Offensive Rookie of the Year (1975); Pro Bowl (1976); PFWA All-Rookie Team (1975); 2× First-team Little All-American (1973, 1974)

Career NFL statistics
- Rushing attempts: 1,087
- Rushing yards: 4,196
- Rushing touchdowns: 19
- Receptions: 192
- Receiving yards: 2,011
- Receiving touchdowns: 11
- Stats at Pro Football Reference

Malcolm "Mike" Thomas (July 17, 1953 – August 23, 2019) was an American professional football player who was a running back for six seasons in the National Football League (NFL) with the Washington Redskins and San Diego Chargers. He was named NFL Offensive Rookie of the Year in 1975.

== Early life ==
Born in Greenville, Texas, Thomas graduated from Greenville High School in 1971 and played college football at the University of Oklahoma and the University of Nevada Las Vegas. At the time, UNLV was a Division II program; it moved up to Division I-A in 1978. In his senior season in 1974, the Rebels were undefeated in the regular season and advanced to the Division II semifinal (Grantland Rice Bowl).

== Professional career ==
Thomas was selected in the fifth round of the 1975 NFL draft by the Washington Redskins. In his rookie season, he rushed for 919 yards and was named the Associated Press Offensive Rookie of the Year. The following season in 1976, Washington returned to the playoffs as the wild card team; Thomas ran for over 1,100 yards and went to the Pro Bowl.

In his fourth season in 1978 under first-year head coach Jack Pardee, the Redskins won their first six games. Thomas injured his ankle in that sixth game and sat out the next three games. Washington lost eight of the last ten games to finish at 8–8 (.500) and missed the playoffs.

Thomas was traded to the San Diego Chargers in May 1979. After playing two seasons, he was waived by the Chargers in September 1981.

== NFL career statistics ==
Legend
| **Bold** | Career high |

=== Regular season ===
| Year | Team | Games | | Rushing | | | | | Receiving | | | | |
| Year | Team | GP | GS | Att | Yds | Avg | Lng | TD | Rec | Yds | Avg | Lng | TD |
|---|---|---|---|---|---|---|---|---|---|---|---|---|---|
| 1975 | WAS | **14** | 10 | 235 | 919 | 3.9 | **34** | 4 | **40** | **483** | **12.1** | 33 | 3 |
| 1976 | WAS | 13 | 12 | **254** | **1,101** | **4.3** | 28 | **5** | 28 | 290 | 10.4 | 34 | **4** |
| 1977 | WAS | 13 | **13** | 228 | 806 | 3.5 | 31 | 3 | 28 | 245 | 8.8 | 25 | 2 |
| 1978 | WAS | 13 | **13** | 161 | 533 | 3.3 | 26 | 3 | 35 | 387 | 11.1 | **35** | 2 |
| 1979 | SDG | **14** | 9 | 91 | 353 | 3.9 | 21 | 1 | 32 | 388 | **12.1** | 32 | 0 |
| 1980 | SDG | 10 | 5 | 118 | 484 | 4.1 | 18 | 3 | 29 | 218 | 7.5 | 27 | 0 |
| Career | | 77 | 62 | 1,087 | 4,196 | 3.9 | 34 | 19 | 192 | 2,011 | 10.5 | 35 | 11 |

=== Playoffs ===
| Year | Team | Games | | Rushing | | | | | Receiving | | | | |
| Year | Team | GP | GS | Att | Yds | Avg | Lng | TD | Rec | Yds | Avg | Lng | TD |
|---|---|---|---|---|---|---|---|---|---|---|---|---|---|
| 1976 | WAS | 1 | **1** | 11 | 45 | **4.1** | **20** | 0 | 2 | 18 | **9.0** | 11 | 0 |
| 1979 | SDG | 1 | 0 | 0 | 0 | 0.0 | 0 | 0 | 0 | 0 | 0.0 | 0 | 0 |
| 1980 | SDG | **2** | 0 | **17** | **70** | **4.1** | 9 | 0 | **6** | **42** | 7.0 | **24** | 0 |
| Career | | 4 | 1 | 28 | 115 | 4.1 | 20 | 0 | 8 | 60 | 7.5 | 24 | 0 |

== Personal life ==
His older brothers Jimmy and Earl Thomas also played in the NFL.

Thomas died at age 66 on August 23, 2019, at a hospital in Houston after a lengthy illness.
