= Cal State Fullerton Titans football =

- First season: 1970; 56 years ago
- Last season: 1992; 34 years ago
- Head coach: Gene Murphy (final coach)
- Location: Fullerton, California
- Stadium: Titan Stadium (capacity: 10,000)
- Conference: Big West Conference
- Colors: Navy blue, white, and orange
- All-time record: 107–150–3 (.417)
- Bowl record: 0–1 (.000)

The Cal State Fullerton Titans football program represented California State University, Fullerton from the 1970 through 1992 seasons. The Titans originally competed as a member of the California Collegiate Athletic Association from 1970 to 1973 before moving to the Pacific Coast Athletic Association (now the Big West) in 1974 where they remained through the 1991 season. The Titans competed in their final year as an I-A Independent prior to the program being disbanded. Fullerton played its home games at multiple stadiums throughout their history with the most recent being Titan Stadium, in Fullerton, California.

== History ==
=== Early history and success (1969–1984) ===
The CSUF Titans football team traces its roots to 1969 when in May, former USC assistant coach Dick Coury was hired as the program's first head coach. The team would win their inaugural game against Cal Poly Pomona by a score of 31–0 on September 19, 1970, and play to a 0–0 tie in their inaugural home game against Cal Lutheran at Anaheim Stadium. Following moderate success in the inaugural 1970 season with a record of 6–4–1, the 1971 season opened with a home game at Santa Ana Stadium versus Southern Utah State with the rest of their home games played at Anaheim Stadium except for a matchup against the Grambling State University Tigers played before their largest ever home crowd of 60,415 at the Los Angeles Memorial Coliseum. Just two weeks prior to the Grambling game, tragedy struck the program when a plane crash on November 13, 1971, resulted in the deaths of three Titan assistant coaches: Joe O'Hara, Dallas Moon and Bill Hannah.

Entering the 1972 season, Pete Yoder started the season as the program's second all-time head coach and the team moved all home games from Anaheim Stadium to Santa Ana Stadium. After completing a pair of 7–4 seasons, the Titans would suffer their first losing season following a 4–7 campaign in the 1974 season. It was during this year that Fullerton would make the move from the California Collegiate Athletic Association into the Pacific Coast Athletic Association (now the Big West).

For the 1975 season, Fullerton would hire former Pacific assistant coach Jim Colletto, as the third head coach in program history and the following season in 1976, the team moved their home games to Falcon Stadium at Cerritos College. During the Colletto era, the Titans would not have a winning season, with the lone bright spot of his tenure coming in 1978 with Obie Graves rushing for 1,789 total yards including 291-yards in a 34–9 upset of Long Beach State. Colletto would resign from his position following the 1979 season with Gene Murphy being announced as the program's fourth all-time head coach on December 16, 1979.

Entering Murphy's first season in 1980, the Titans would move their home games to an on-campus stadium, Titan Field, and continue to not see success on the field with losing seasons from the 1980 through the 1982 seasons. For the 1983 season, Fullerton split their home games between Anaheim Stadium and Glover Stadium, while the team played in the 1983 California Bowl after winning their first conference championship. The Titans would build upon their successes in finishing the 1984 season again as conference champion with a record of 11–1, while moving home games back to Santa Ana Stadium. Following the season, Murphy was named UPI West Coast Coach of the Year and the Titans would finish in the final top 20 UPI poll.

=== Decline and cancellation (1985–1992) ===
The Titans would never again reach the highs of the 1984 season and would embark on a steady decline through the late 1980s and into the early 1990s.

By the late 1980s, the program was in financial trouble. The team played the 1992 season at on-campus Titan Stadium, but during that year, the Fullerton Academic Senate voted 24–7 to recommend disbanding the program. That decision was halted by then-university president Milton A. Gordon on December 7, 1992 and Fullerton announced that it would suspend the program effective immediately for one year, with the intention of returning to play at the Division I-AA level for the 1994 season. However, citing budget restraints, Cal State Fullerton decided in February 1994 against bringing back football.

=== Efforts to reinstate football ===
By 1995, the notion of resurrecting the program began to take shape. In fall 1995, the Fullerton Students Athletic Advisory Committee asked the student body in an election if they supported Titan football. At that time, 89 percent of respondents voted favorably for the reinstatement of football.

Cal State Fullerton alumni established the organization Bring Back Titan Football in 2007 to advocate the return of the football program. In 2008, Cal State Fullerton established a task force exploring the feasibility of bringing back football.

=== NCAA records ===
Although the Titans have not played a game since 1992, Fullerton is still the NCAA record holder in several categories. These records include: both most fumbles and most fumbles lost for a single season with 73 and 41 respectively during the 1992 season; the most kickoff returns per game with an average of 7.3 per game for the 1990 season; the 10th highest number of rushing yards in a single game with 357 by Mike Pringle on November 4, 1989, against New Mexico State; and being part of the fourth highest combined score in a tied game with their 41–41 contest against San Diego State on September 23, 1989.

== Conference championships ==
Cal State Fullerton won two conference championships during its tenure as a football program. Both of these seasons saw the record amended due to violations from UNLV that resulted in Cal State Fullerton gaining a win for both the 1983 and 1984 seasons. Due to this, the team went undefeated in conference play for both seasons.

Season	Conference	Coach	Overall Record	Conference Record
1983	Big West Conference	Gene Murphy	8–4	6–0
1984	Big West Conference	Gene Murphy	12–0	7–0

== Head coaches ==
Cal State Fullerton had four head coaches during their 23 seasons as a college football program.

Tenure	Coach	Years	Record	Pct.
1970–71	Dick Coury	2	13–8–1	.614
1972–74	Pete Yoder	3	18–15–0	.546
1975–79	Jim Colletto	5	17–38–1	.313
1980–92	Gene Murphy	13	59–89–1	.399

== Records ==
=== Seasons ===
Conference champions *	Bowl game berth ^

Season	Head coach	Conference	Season results				Bowl result
Season	Head coach	Conference	Conference finish	Wins	Losses	Ties	Bowl result
1970	Dick Coury	California Collegiate Athletic Association	—	6	4	1	—
1971	Dick Coury	California Collegiate Athletic Association	—	7	4	0	Won 1971 Mercy Bowl against Fresno State Bulldogs, 17–14 ^
1972	Pete Yoder	California Collegiate Athletic Association	—	7	4	0	—
1973	Pete Yoder	California Collegiate Athletic Association	—	7	4	0	—
1974	Pete Yoder	Pacific Coast Athletic Association	—	4	7	0	—
1975	Jim Colletto	Pacific Coast Athletic Association	—	2	9	0	—
1976	Jim Colletto	Pacific Coast Athletic Association	—	3	7	1	—
1977	Jim Colletto	Pacific Coast Athletic Association	—	4	7	0	—
1978	Jim Colletto	Pacific Coast Athletic Association	—	5	7	0	—
1979	Jim Colletto	Pacific Coast Athletic Association	—	3	8	0	—
1980	Gene Murphy	Pacific Coast Athletic Association	—	4	7	0	—
1981	Gene Murphy	Pacific Coast Athletic Association	—	3	8	0	—
1982	Gene Murphy	Pacific Coast Athletic Association	—	3	9	0	—
1983 *	Gene Murphy	Pacific Coast Athletic Association	1st	7	5	0	Lost 1983 California Bowl to Northern Illinois Huskies, 13–20 ^
1984 *	Gene Murphy	Pacific Coast Athletic Association	T—1st	11	1	0	—
1985	Gene Murphy	Pacific Coast Athletic Association	—	6	5	0	—
1986	Gene Murphy	Pacific Coast Athletic Association	—	3	9	0	—
1987	Gene Murphy	Pacific Coast Athletic Association	—	6	6	0	—
1988	Gene Murphy	Big West Conference	—	5	6	0	—
1989	Gene Murphy	Big West Conference	—	6	4	1	—
1990	Gene Murphy	Big West Conference	—	1	11	0	—
1991	Gene Murphy	Big West Conference	—	2	9	0	—
1992	Gene Murphy	Independent	—	2	9	0	—
Total				107	148	3	(only includes regular season games)
Total				0	2	0	(only includes bowl games)
Total				107	150	3	(all games)

== Bowl games ==
Cal State Fullerton participated in two bowl games. They had a bowl record of 1–1, although only the first counted under NCAA standards.

Year	Bowl	Opponent	Result
December 11, 1971	Mercy Bowl II	Fresno State Bulldogs	W 17–13
December 17, 1983	California Bowl	NIU Huskies	L 14–17

== All-Americans ==
Name	Position	Year	Team
Obie Graves	RB	1978	AP-3rd Team

== Titans in the Pros ==
=== In the NFL ===
California State University, Fullerton has 22 alumni that have played in the National Football League.

Name	Position	Year	Overall pick	Team
Mike Ernst	QB	1972	Free agent	Denver Broncos
Johnnie Gray	S	1975	Free agent	Green Bay Packers
M. L. Carter	CB	1979	Free agent	Kansas City Chiefs
Grady Richardson	TE	1979	Free agent	Washington Redskins
Lucious Smith	CB	1980	Free agent	Los Angeles Rams
Bobby Kemp	DB	1981	202	Cincinnati Bengals
Daren Gilbert	OT	1985	38	New Orleans Saints
Mark Collins	DB	1986	44	New York Giants
Vince Gamache	P	1986	Free agent	Seattle Seahawks
James Pruitt	WR	1986	107	Miami Dolphins
Vince Abbott	K	1987	Free agent	San Diego Chargers
Alex Espinoza	QB	1987	Free agent	Kansas City Chiefs
Rick Calhoun	RB	1987	Free agent	Los Angeles Raiders
Hank Goebel	OT	1987	Free agent	Los Angeles Rams
A.J. Jenkins	DE/LB	1987	228	Pittsburgh Steelers
Wade Lockett	WR	1987	Free agent	Los Angeles Raiders
Ronald McLean	DE/NT	1987	Free agent	Denver Broncos
Cornelius Redick	WR	1987	Free agent	Green Bay Packers
Marvin Williams	TE	1987	Free agent	Washington Redskins
Michael Rhyan	QB	1988	332	Denver Broncos
Mike Pringle	RB	1990	139	Atlanta Falcons
Reggie Redding	OG/T	1991	Free agent	Atlanta Falcons
Mike Rogan	OG	1991	Free Agent	Chicago Bears
Kurt Bloedorn	P	1993, 1994, 1995	Free agent	Buffalo Bills, New York Giants, Dallas Cowboys
Alexander Stewart	DE	1989, 1989, 1990, 1991, 1992, 1993, 1995	219	Minnesota Vikings, Dallas Cowboys, Houston Oilers, BC Lions

=== In the CFL ===
In addition to the players that competed in the NFL, there have been several former Titans that have had significant careers in the Canadian Football League. The three players of note include: Mike Pringle who is the league's all-time leading rusher, Damon Allen, the league's second all-time leading passer and former all-time pro football passing leader with 72,381 passing yards, and Allen Pitts, the league's all-time leading receiver until 2008 when he was surpassed by Milt Stegall.

Amazingly, during the period between 2006 and 2008, the CFL all-time leaders in passing, rushing and receiving yardage were simultaneously former Cal State Fullerton Titans.

=== In the Arena Football League ===
- Quinton Knight, three time First Team All-Arena selection

== Stadiums ==
- Anaheim Stadium (1970–1971, 1983)
- Santa Ana Stadium (1971–1975, 1984–1991)
- Falcon Stadium (1976–1979)
- Titan Field (1980–1982)
- Glover Stadium (1983)
- Titan Stadium (1992)
