= Les Davis (American football) =

American football player and coach (1937–2007)

Biographical details
- Born: August 13, 1937; Corning, Arkansas, U.S.
- Died: December 19, 2007 (aged 70)

Playing career
- 1961–1962: San Jose State
- Position: Guard

Coaching career (HC unless noted)
- 1963: San Jose State (GA)
- 1964: Stanford (GA)
- 1965: Cal State Hayward (line)
- 1966–1970: Cal State Hayward
- 1971: New Mexico Highlands
- 1972–1973: California (assistant)
- 1974–1975: Newark HS (CA)

Head coaching record
- Overall: 31–28–2 (college)

Accomplishments and honors

Championships
- 2 FWC (1969–1970)

Lester Ray Davis (August 13, 1937 – December 19, 2007) was an American football player and coach. He served as the head football coach at California State College at Hayward—now known as California State University, East Bay—from 1966 to 1970 and at New Mexico Highlands University in 1971, compiling a career college football coaching record of 31–28–2. Davis played college football at San Jose State University, earning letters in 1961 and 1962. He came to Cal State Hayward in 1965 as line coach under Darryl Rogers.

== Head coaching record ==
=== College ===
| Year | Team | Overall | Conference | Standing | Bowl/playoffs | UPI^{#} |
|---|---|---|---|---|---|---|
Cal State Hayward Pioneers (Far Western Conference) (1966–1970)
| 1966 | Cal State Hayward | 2–8 | 1–5 | T–6th | | |
| 1967 | Cal State Hayward | 7–3 | 3–3 | 4th | | |
| 1968 | Cal State Hayward | 5–4–1 | 1–4–1 | T–6th | | |
| 1969 | Cal State Hayward | 9–1 | 5–0 | 1st | | 15 |
| 1970 | Cal State Hayward | 7–4 | 3–1 | T–1st | | |
| Cal State Hayward: | | 30–20–1 | 13–13–1 | | | |
New Mexico Highlands Cowboys (NAIA Division I independent) (1971)
| 1971 | New Mexico Highlands | 1–8–1 | | | | |
| New Mexico Highlands: | | 1–8–1 | | | | |
| Total: | | 31–28–2 | | | | |
National championship Conference title Conference division title or championship game berth
