= Cal State East Bay Pioneers =

University athletic program

- University: California State University, East Bay
- Nickname: Pioneers
- NCAA: Division II
- Conference: CCAA (primary); WWPA (women's water polo)
- Athletic director: Allison Kern
- Location: Hayward, California
- First season: 1961
- Varsity teams: 15 (6 men's, 9 women's)
- Basketball arena: Pioneer Gymnasium
- Baseball stadium: Pioneer Baseball Field
- Softball stadium: Pioneer Softball Field
- Soccer stadium: Pioneer Stadium
- Aquatics center: Pioneer Pool
- Colors: East Bay red, white, and black
- Mascot: Pioneer Pete
- Website: eastbaypioneers.com

Team NCAA championships
- 2

Individual and relay NCAA champions
- 22

The Cal State East Bay Pioneers (also CSU East Bay Pioneers, East Bay Pioneers, and CSUEB Pioneers; formerly Cal State Hayward Pioneers) are the athletic teams that represent California State University, East Bay, located in Hayward, California, in intercollegiate sports as a member of the Division II level of the National Collegiate Athletic Association (NCAA), primarily competing in the California Collegiate Athletic Association (CCAA) for most of their sports since the 2009–10 academic year; while its women's water polo teams compete in the Western Water Polo Association (WWPA). The Pioneers previously competed in the California Pacific Conference (Cal Pac) of the National Association of Intercollegiate Athletics (NAIA) from 1998–99 to 2008–09.

== History ==
Men's sports	Women's sports
Baseball	Basketball
Basketball	Cross country
Cross country	Golf
Golf	Soccer
Soccer	Softball
Track and field^{†}	Swimming and diving
	Track and field^{†}
	Volleyball
	Water polo
† – Track and field includes both indoor and outdoor.

Cal State East Bay began Division II competition in 2008 as part of a transition to the NCAA and had previously been a dual member of NCAA Division III and the National Association of Intercollegiate Athletics (NAIA) with ten sports competing as NCAA D-III Independents and five sports in the NAIA's California Pacific Conference. Historically, Cal State East Bay was a member of Division II from 1961–62 to 1997–98.

From 1961 until their closing in 1993, the Pioneers football team won a total of six conference collegiate championships. Cal State East Bay has produced over 160 All-Americans and has won 77 conference championships in NCAA Divisions II and III, as well as in the National Association of Intercollegiate Athletics. In 1972 and 1981, the women's outdoor track and field team won national championships. The first was an outright championship, and the second was as a member of the AIAW Division III. In 1979 and 1980 the women's cross country team won AIAW Division III national championships. In 1988 the women's soccer team won the NCAA Division II National Championship. In 2008, the women's water polo team won the Division III National Championship.

== Varsity teams ==
CSUEB competes in 15 intercollegiate varsity sports: Men's sports include baseball, basketball, cross country, golf, soccer and track & field (indoor and outdoor); while women's sports include basketball, cross country, golf, soccer, softball, swimming, track & field (indoor and outdoor), volleyball and water polo.

== Championships ==
=== Appearances ===
The CSU East Bay Pioneers competed in the NCAA Tournament across 12 active sports (6 men's and 7 women's) 70 times at the Division II level.

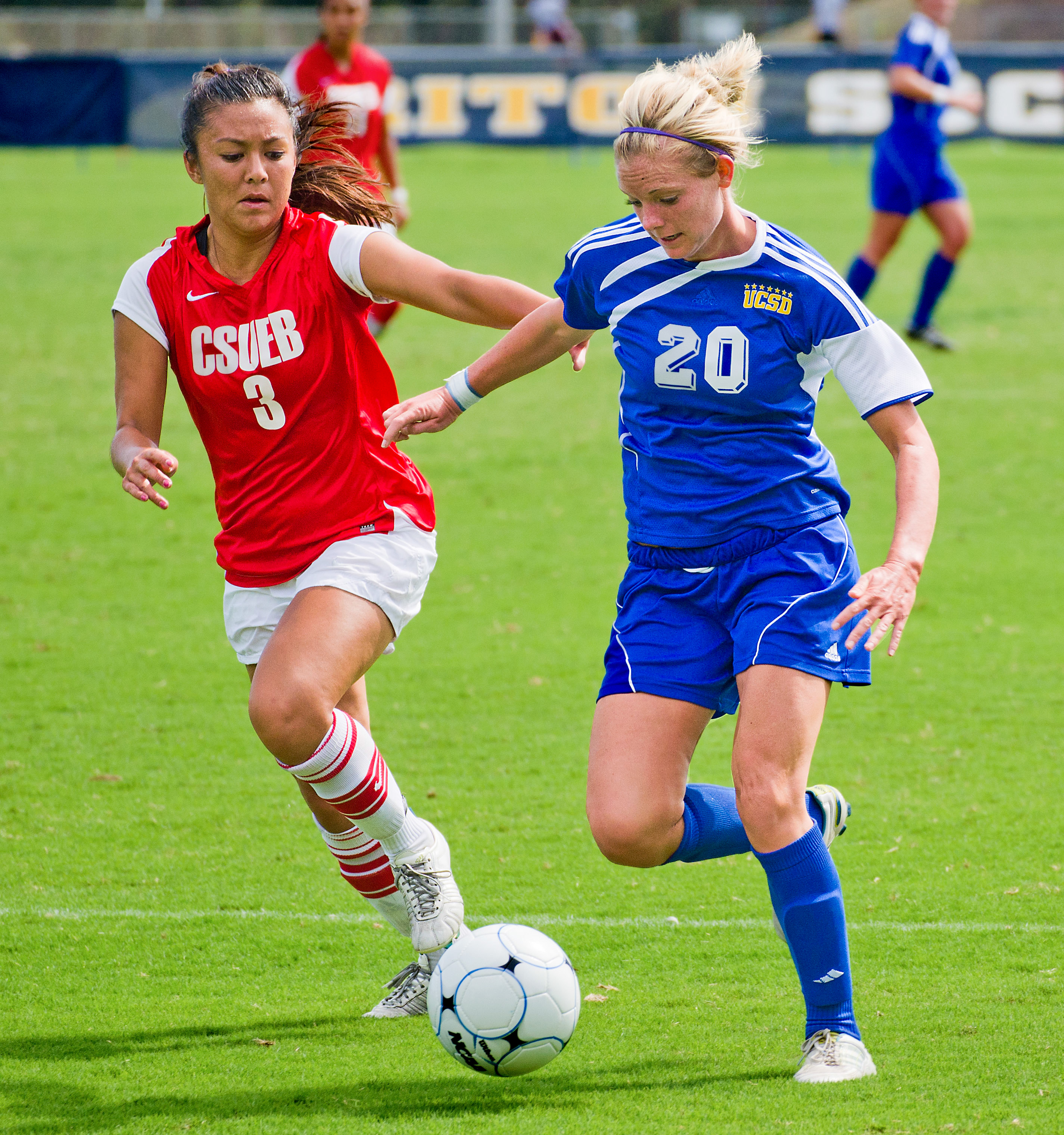
A CSUEB soccer player attempting to take the ball from a University of California, San Diego attacker in 2011

- Baseball (3): 1972, 1977, 2016
- Men's basketball (6): 1977, 1985, 1986, 1987, 1988, 2026
- Women's basketball (3): 1989, 2017, 2022
- Men's cross country (1): 1986
- Women's cross country (1): 1983
- Men's golf (1): 2017
- Men's soccer (8): 1974, 1975, 1976, 1982, 1983, 1984, 1988, 1989
- Women's soccer (1): 1988, 2021
- Softball (1): 1992, 2025, 2026
- Women's swimming and diving (11): 1982, 1983, 1985, 1988, 1990, 1991, 1992, 2013, 2014, 2017, 2018
- Men's outdoor track and field (23): 1965, 1968, 1969, 1970, 1971, 1972, 1973, 1974, 1975, 1976, 1977, 1978, 1979, 1980, 1981, 1982, 1983, 1984, 1985, 1989, 1991, 1992, 2016
- Women's outdoor track and field (12): 1982, 1983, 1984, 1985, 1986, 1987, 1988, 1989, 1990, 1991, 1992, 2014
- Women's volleyball (1): 2018

=== Team ===
The Pioneers of CSU East Bay earned 2 NCAA team championships at the Division II level.

- Men's (1)
  - Outdoor track and field (1): 1977
- Women's (1)
  - Soccer (1): 1988

Results

School year	Sport	Opponent	Score
1976–77	Men's outdoor track and field	UC Irvine	66–58
1988–89	Women's soccer	Barry	1–0

Below are four national championships that were not bestowed by the NCAA:

- Women's cross country – Division III (2): 1979, 1980 (AIAW)
- Women's outdoor track and field – Division I (1): 1972 (AIAW)
- Women's outdoor track and field – Division III (1): 1981 (AIAW)

=== Individual ===
CSU East Bay had 22 Pioneers win NCAA individual championships at the Division II level.

NCAA individual championships
Order	School year	Athlete(s)	Sport	Source
1	1967–68	Clayton Larson	Men's outdoor track and field	
2	1970–71	Martin Voves	Men's swimming and diving	
3	1970–71	Andy Weber	Men's outdoor track and field	
4	1973–74	Greg Blankenship	Men's outdoor track and field	
5	1973–74	Brad Nave	Men's outdoor track and field	
6	1974–75	Greg Blankenship	Men's outdoor track and field	
7	1974–75	Dave Haber	Men's outdoor track and field	
8	1975–76	Dave Haber	Men's outdoor track and field	
9	1976–77	Dave Haber	Men's outdoor track and field	
10	1976–77	John LeGrande	Men's outdoor track and field	
11	1977–78	Doug Garner	Men's outdoor track and field	
12	1977–78	Mark Sawyer	Men's outdoor track and field	
13	1978–79	Doug Garner	Men's outdoor track and field	
14	1980–81	Sandy Labeaux	Men's outdoor track and field	
15	1981–82	Jim Moran	Men's outdoor track and field	
16	1981–82	Diane Oswalt	Women's outdoor track and field	
17	1982–83	Glenda Ford	Women's outdoor track and field	
18	1982–83	Mary Patten	Women's swimming and diving	
19	1983–84	Jim Moran	Men's outdoor track and field	
20	1983–84	Diane Oswalt	Women's outdoor track and field	
21	1984–85	Diane Oswalt	Women's outdoor track and field	
22	1991–92	Rhonda Colvin	Women's outdoor track and field	
