= Greenville High School (Texas) =

Public school in Texas, United States

Coordinates: 33.1047°N 96.1201°W

Location
- 3515 Lion's Lair; Greenville, Texas 75402; United States

Information
- School type: Public high school
- School district: Greenville Independent School District
- Principal: William Stewart
- Teaching staff: 93.4 (FTE)
- Grades: 9–12
- Enrollment: 1,520 (2024–2025)"GREENVILLE H S". Texas Schools.
- Student to teacher ratio: 16.3
- Colors: Red, white, and black
- Athletics conference: UIL Class AAAAA
- Mascot: Lions
- Rival: Sulphur Springs Wildcats, Royse City Bulldogs
- Website: ghs.greenvilleisd.com/o/ghs

Greenville High School is a public high school located in Greenville, Texas, United States. It is classified as a 5A school by the University Interscholastic League (UIL). The school is part of the Greenville Independent School District in Hunt County. In 2013, the school was rated "Met Standard" by the Texas Education Agency.

== Overview ==
Greenville High School is the comprehensive public high school of the Greenville Independent School District, serving students in grades 9–12 in Greenville, Texas. The school enrolls approximately 1,500 students and is classified as a UIL Class 5A school.

The campus hosts Greenville Early College High School, a program that allows students to earn college credit through dual-credit coursework in partnership with Paris Junior College. Students in the program may complete up to 60 college credit hours and earn an associate degree while completing high school.

Greenville High School also offers Career and Technical Education (CTE) programs through multiple endorsement pathways, including STEM, Business and Industry, and Public Service.

== History ==
Greenville High School has served secondary students in Greenville for much of the twentieth century. Prior to school integration, African-American students attended separate schools in Greenville, including Carver High School, which was built on West Lee Street in 1950. In 1965, Greenville's public schools were integrated....

Greenville Carver High School competed in the Prairie View Interscholastic League (PVIL). The school's football team reached the PVIL Class 2A state finals in 1954....

== Athletics ==
The Greenville Lions compete in cross country, football, volleyball, basketball, soccer, tennis, golf, track, softball, and baseball.

=== State titles ===
Greenville (UIL)

- Football
  - 1933(1A)
- Boys Track
  - 1915(All), 1916(All)

==== State finalists ====
Greenville (UIL)

- Football
  - 1935(1A)

Greenville Carver (PVIL)

- Football
  - 1954(PVIL-2A)

== Programs ==
=== Robotics ===
==== Team 148 ====
Greenville High School is home to Team 148, the Robowranglers, a FIRST Robotics Competition (FRC) team founded in 1992. The team is the oldest sustaining robotics teams in Texas and has earned national and international recognition through its participation in FIRST Robotics Competition events.

The Robowranglers have won multiple world championships (1993, 2008, and 2018) competitions and are widely regarded as one of the most successful high school robotics programs in the United States. The team regularly qualifies for district and world championship events and has received numerous awards for engineering, innovation, and robot design.

The program operates in partnership with community mentors and industry sponsors and serves as a flagship STEM program within Greenville ISD.

== Notable alumni ==
- Jay Arnold, former NFL player
- John Franklin-Myers, NFL player
- Byron Bell, NFL player
- Joe Coomer, former NFL player
- Bob Gruber, former NFL player
- George Maddox, former NFL player
- Earl Thomas, former NFL player
- Mike Thomas, former NFL player
- Ed Howard, former member of the Texas State House of Representatives and Senate
