= Majors Stadium =

Former stadium in Greenville, Texas

Coordinates: 33.1411°N 96.1022°W

- Interactive map of Majors Stadium
- Full name: Majors Stadium
- Former names: Phillips Field
- Location: Greenville, Texas

Construction
- Opened: 1929
- Closed: 1964

Tenants
- Greenville Majors (East Texas League) (1946) (Big State League) (1947-1950, 1953) (Sooner State League) (1957)

Majors Stadium was a baseball field in Greenville, TX that started out as a football field called Phillips Field which was later altered to allow baseball to be played.

== Phillips Field ==
Before Majors Stadium became a baseball diamond, it was used in the early years by local high school football teams. On October 4, 1929, Dallas Oak Cliff and Greenville High School played the first contest at the venue.

The field was transformed for the Greenville Majors after their first year of existence. In 1947, the football stands were removed and the stands were rebuilt to accommodate baseball.

=== Visit by the Yankees ===
The New York Yankees played the Greenville Majors on April 10, 1949, in an exhibition game. The Majors won the game, 4–3.

== Remnants ==
The only parts left are the arched entryway and a fieldhouse where the field used to exist.

== Sources ==
- Texas Almanac 2008-2009. Texas State Historical Association. September 14, 2007. ISBN 978-0-914-51141-0.
