= Joe Coomer (American football) =

American football player (1917–1979)

No. 24, 82, 50
- Position: Offensive tackle

Personal information
- Born: September 11, 1917; Greenville, Texas, U.S.
- Died: October 18, 1979 (aged 62); Tyler, Texas, U.S.

Career information
- High school: Greenville (Greenville, Texas)
- College: Austin College

Career history
- Pittsburgh Steelers (1941, 1945–1946); Chicago Cardinals (1947–1949)

Awards and highlights
- NFL champion (1947); Pro Bowl (1941); Greenville High School Hall of Fame

Career statistics
- Games played: 62
- Games started: 17
- Fumble recoveries: 4

Joe David Coomer (September 11, 1917 – October 18, 1979) was an American professional football player who was an offensive guard and defensive tackle for six seasons for the Pittsburgh Steelers and the Chicago Cardinals.

Coomer was born on September 11, 1917, in Greenville, Texas. He went to Austin College. He played professional American football for a total of 62 games.
