= Audie Murphy American Cotton Museum =

Museum in Greenville, Texas, US

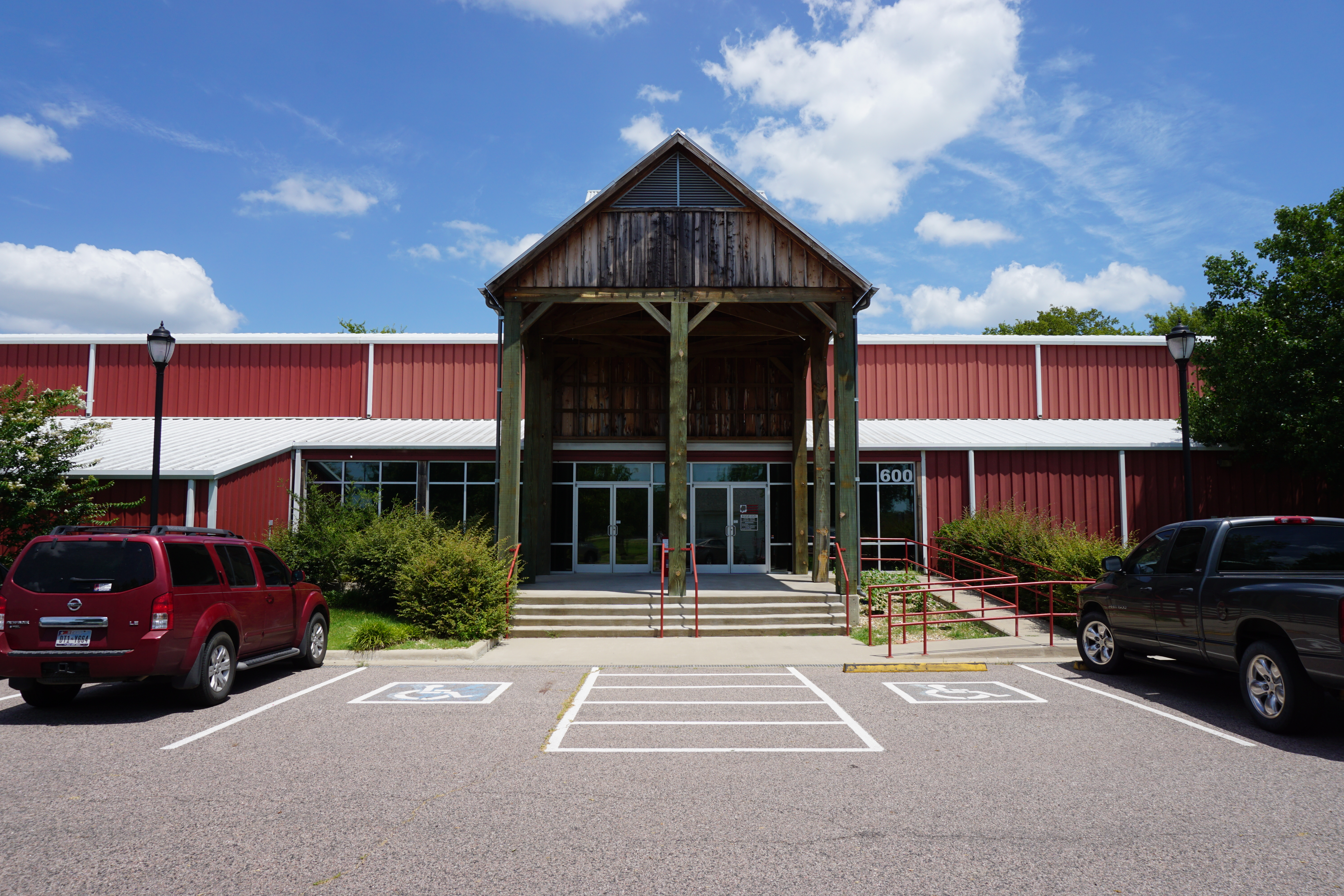
- The exterior of the Audie Murphy American Cotton Museum in July 2015

- Location within Texas
- Location: Greenville, Texas
- Coordinates: 33.1258°N 96.0895°W
- Website: Audie Murphy American Cotton Museum

The Audie Murphy American Cotton Museum is located at 600 Interstate 30 East, in the city of Greenville, county of Hunt, in the U.S. state of Texas. It was established in 1987. Cotton was Hunt County's largest cash crop in the early 20th century, and the museum features a "History of Cotton" exhibit.

Much of the focus of the museum is dedicated to military veterans. Medal of Honor recipient Audie Murphy was born in Hunt County and worked in Greenville before entering the military. The Hunt County War Memorial was dedicated on the museum's grounds in 2004. The memorial features a 10-foot (3 m) bronze statue of Murphy created by Greenville artist Gordon Thomas. The granite stones that circle the monument are carved with the names of the county's war dead. Other stones contain quotes from Murphy, Franklin D. Roosevelt, and Ronald Reagan.

In 2012, the Audie L. Murphy Memorial VA Hospital in San Antonio transferred its collection of Murphy-related memorabilia to the museum for its permanent collection. The museum sponsors the area's annual Audie Murphy Days, usually scheduled in June.

== Gallery ==
=== Exhibits and displays ===
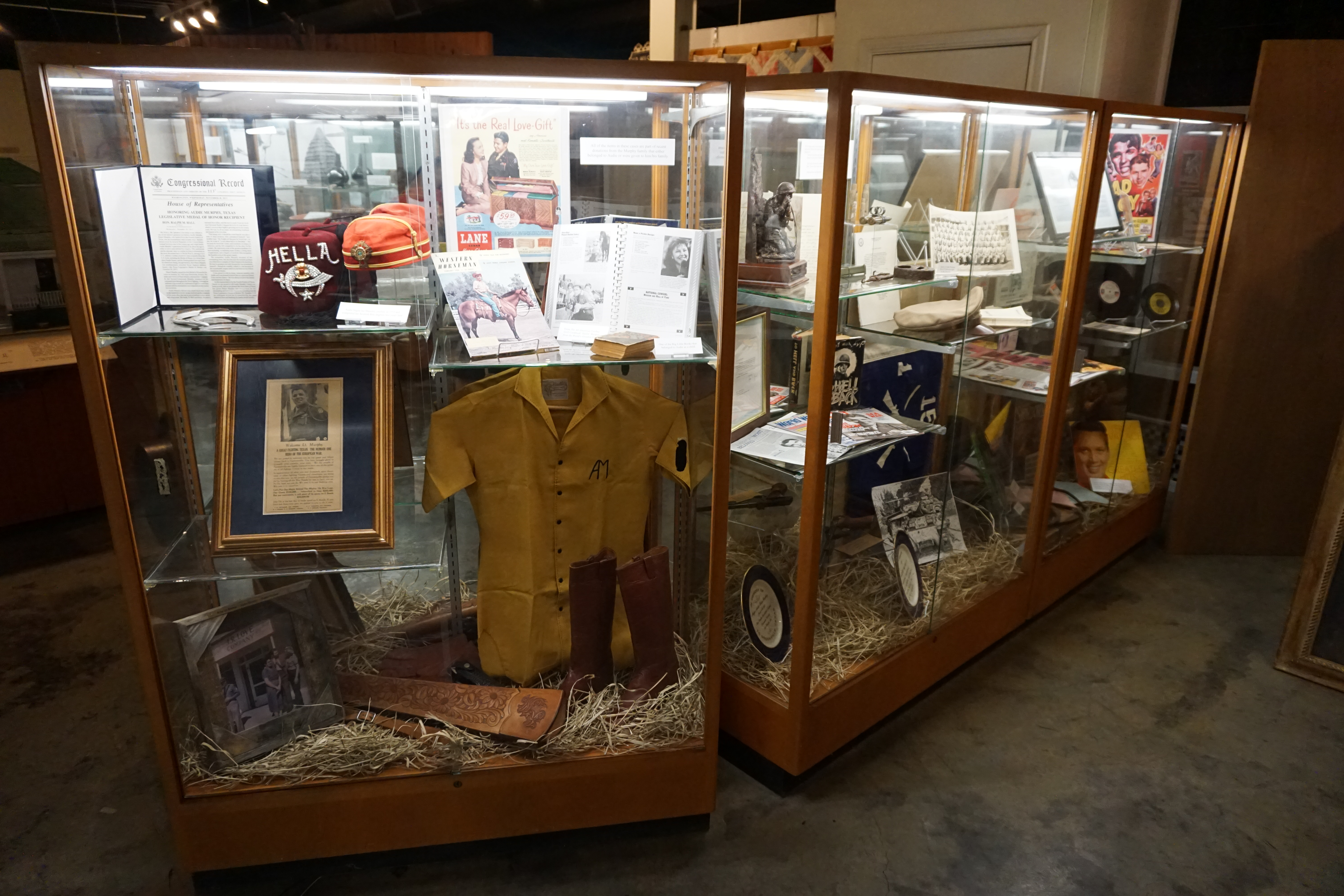
Audie Murphy display

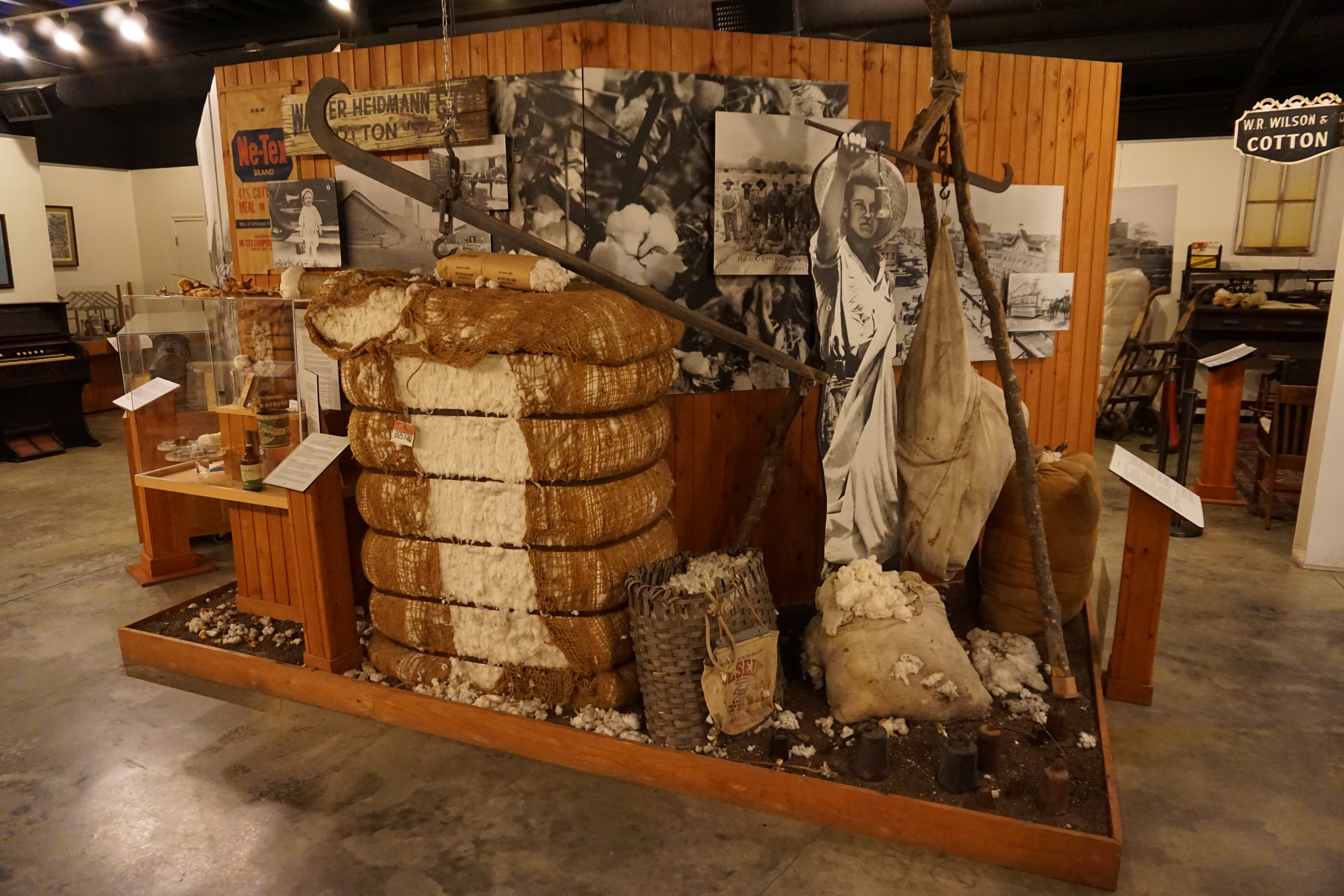
Hunt County cotton exhibit

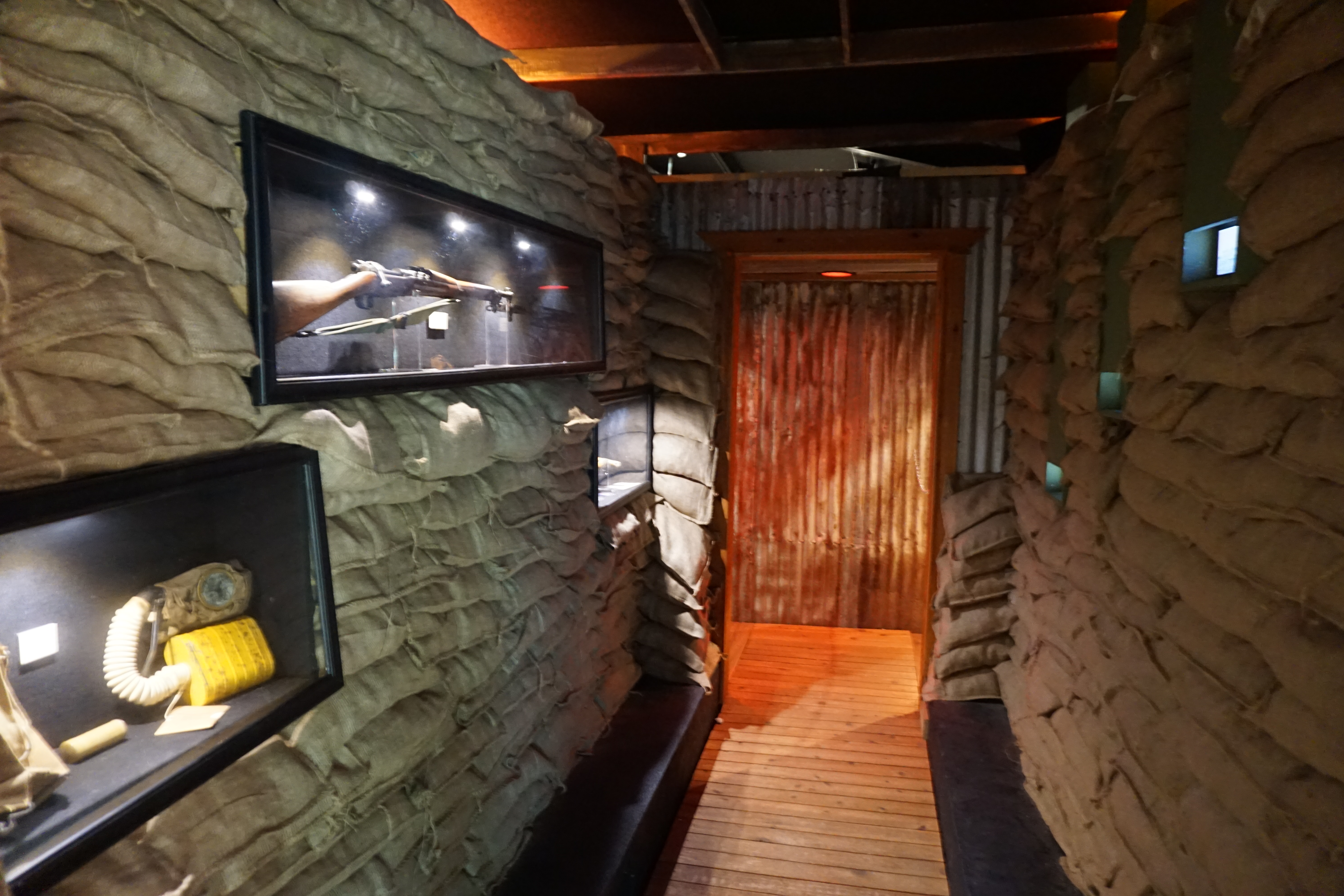
World War I trench diorama

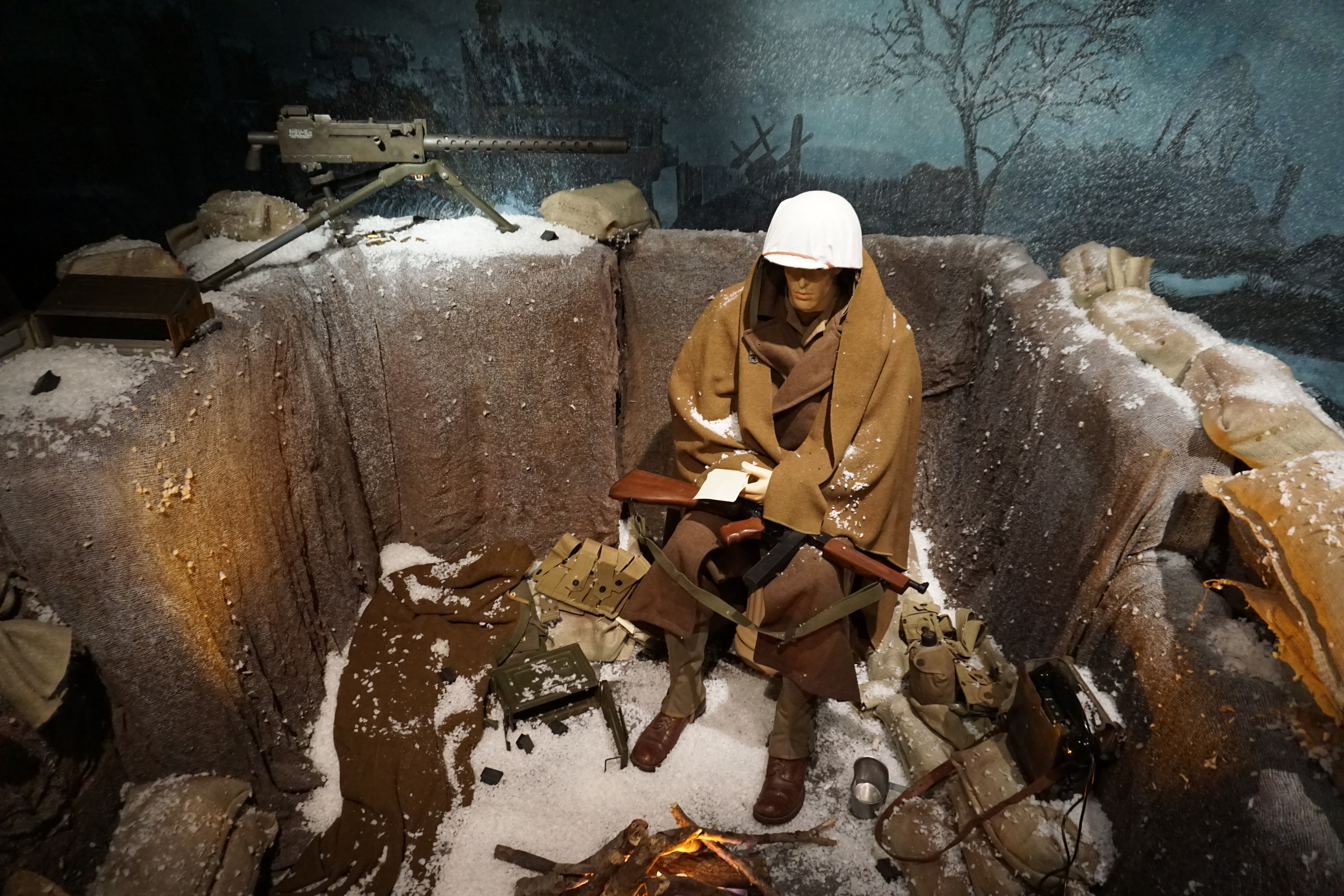
Battle of the Bulge diorama

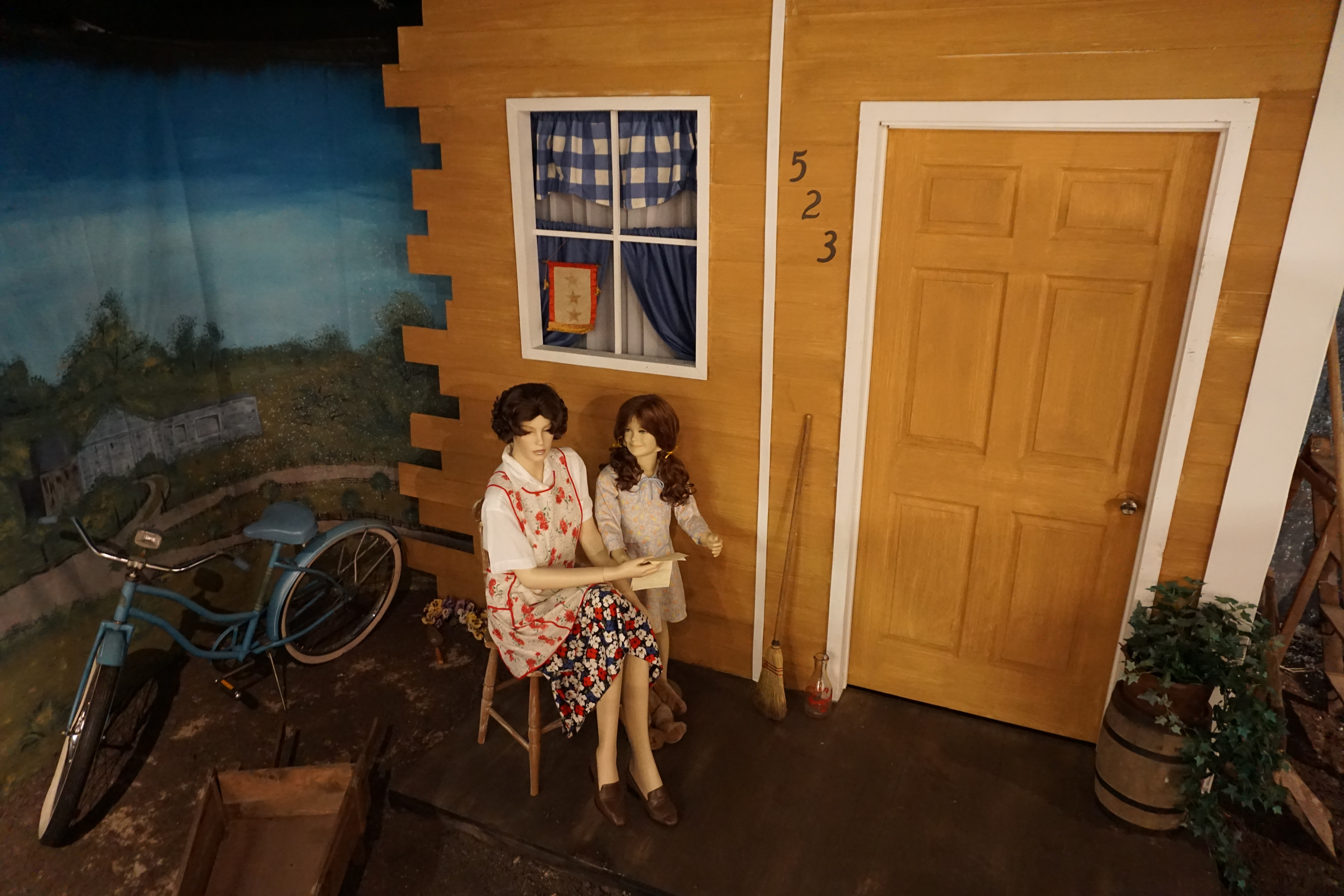
World War II American home front diorama

=== On the grounds ===
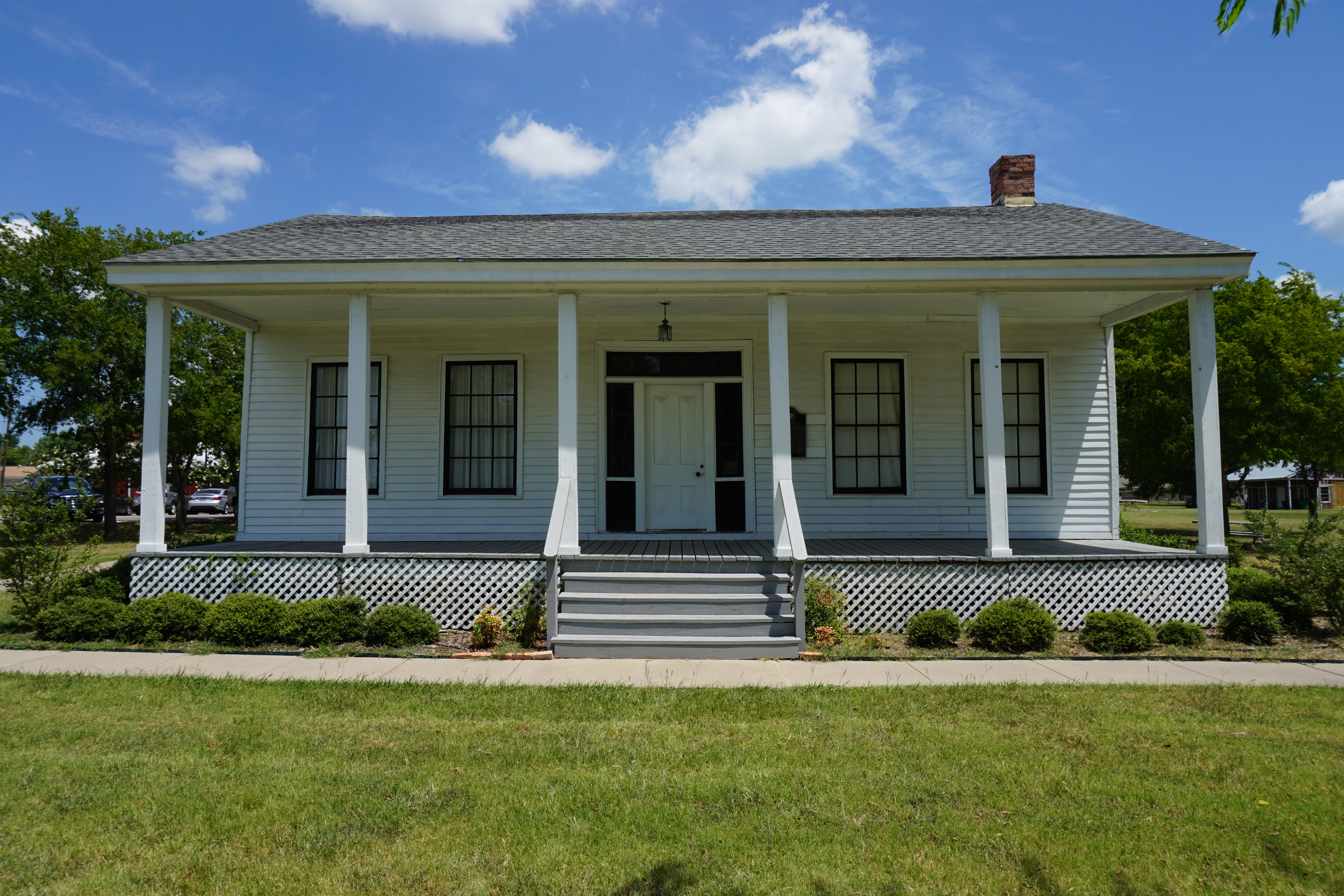
Ende-Gaillard House

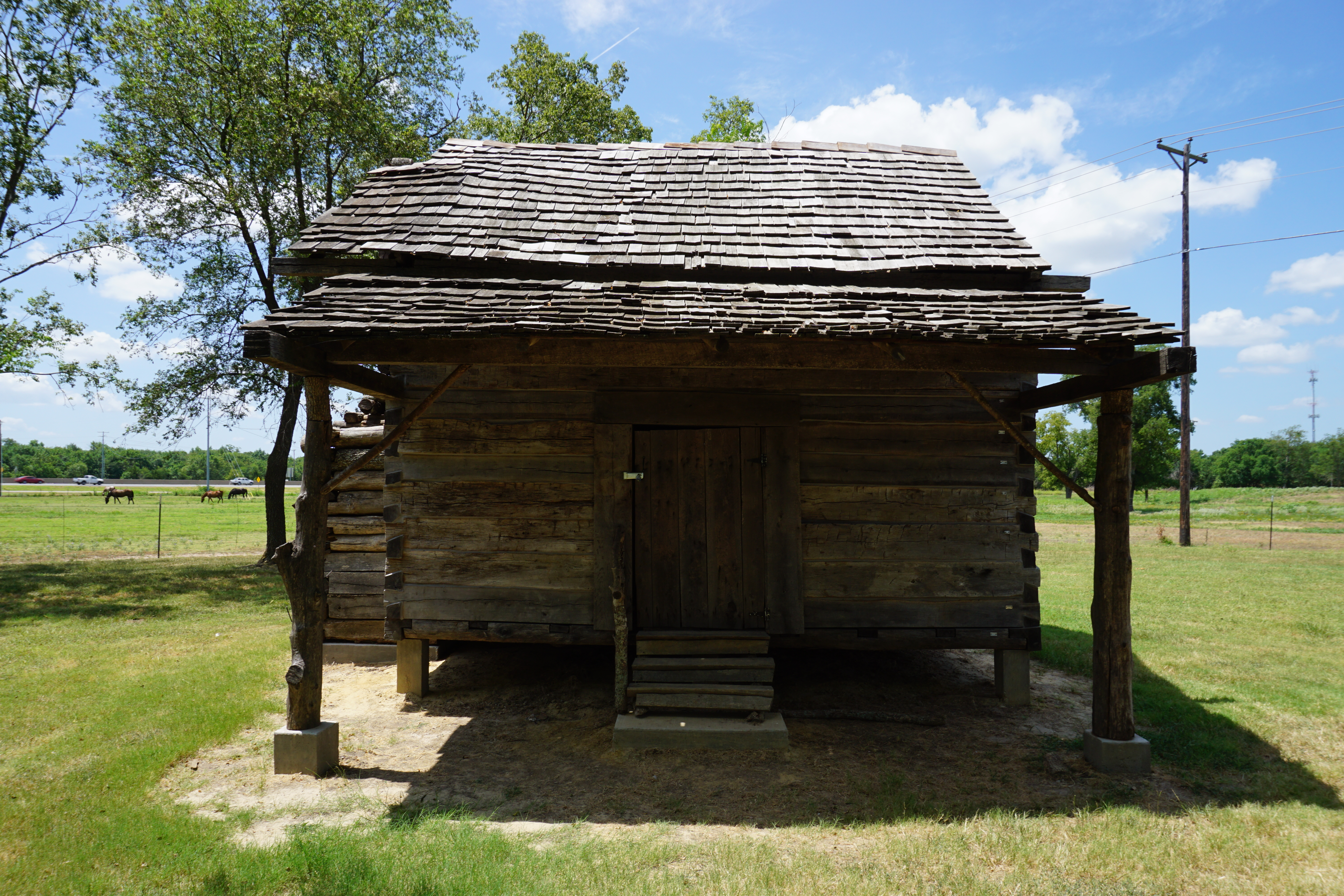
Wilkins Log Cabin

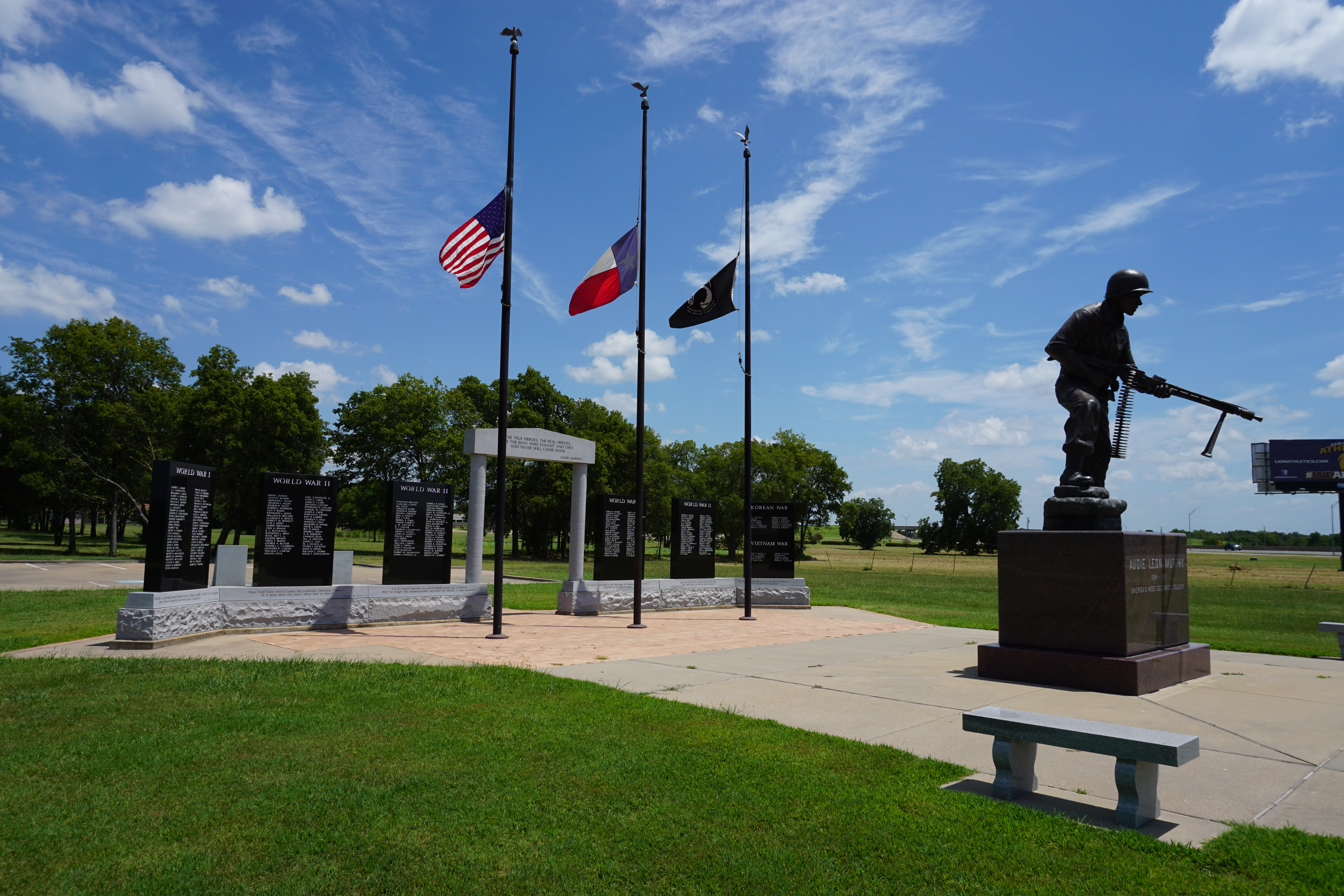
Audie Murphy Hunt County War Memorial
