= Jimmy Thomas (American football) =

American football player (1947–2017)

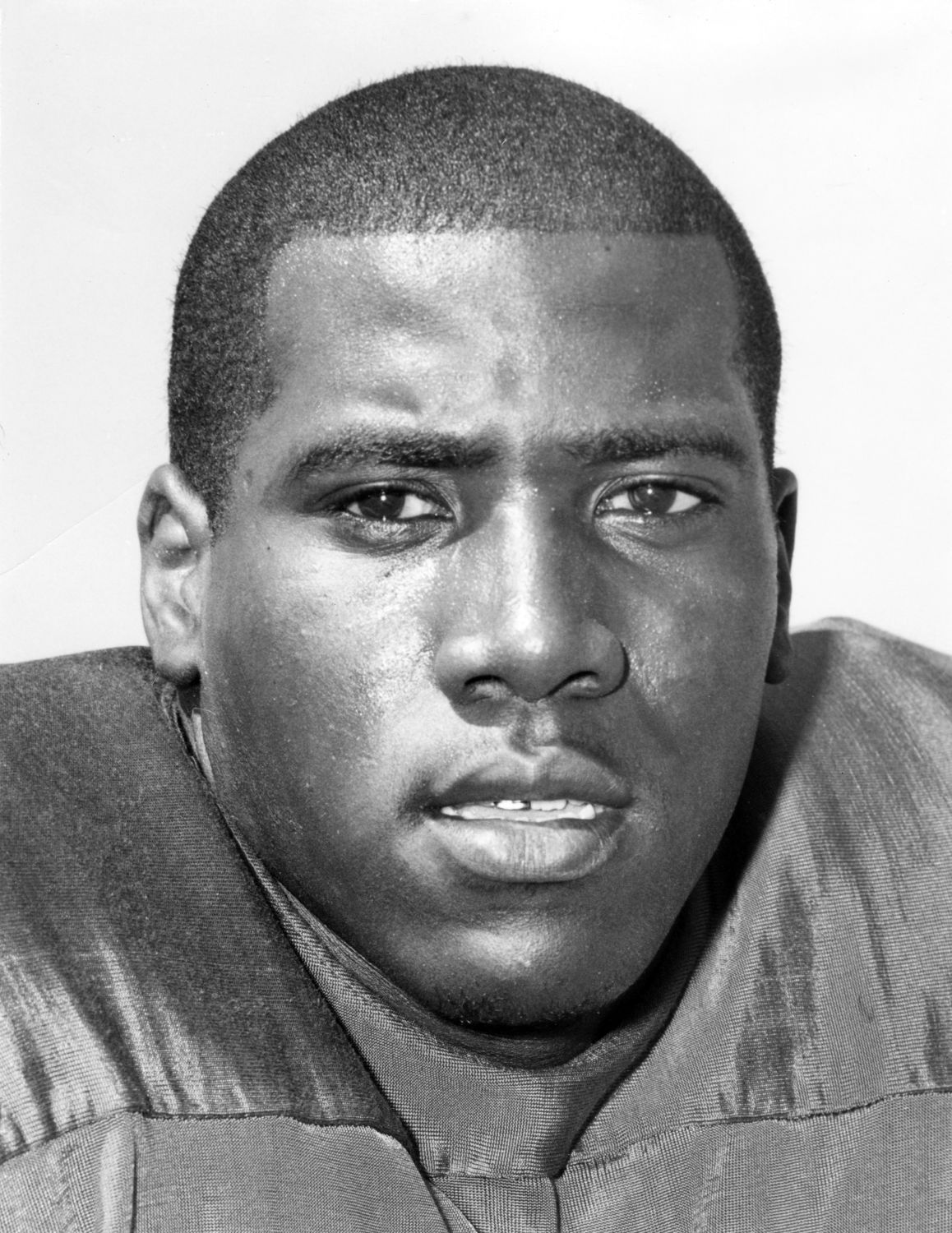

No. 24
- Positions: Running back, Wide receiver

Personal information
- Born: August 17, 1947; Greenville, Texas, U.S.
- Died: June 6, 2017 (aged 69); Fort Worth, Texas, U.S.
- Listed height: 6 ft 2 in (1.88 m)
- Listed weight: 214 lb (97 kg)

Career information
- High school: George Washington Carver (Greenville)
- College: Texas–Arlington
- NFL draft: 1969: 6th round, 146th overall pick

Career history
- San Francisco 49ers (1969–1973)

Career NFL statistics
- Rushing yards: 824
- Rushing average: 5
- Receptions: 67
- Receiving yards: 923
- Total touchdowns: 12
- Stats at Pro Football Reference

James Thomas Jr. (August 17, 1947 – June 6, 2017) was an American professional football running back in the National Football League (NFL). He played five seasons (1969–1973) for the San Francisco 49ers. His brothers Earl Thomas and Mike Thomas also played in the NFL.
