= Byron Bell =

American football player (born 1989)

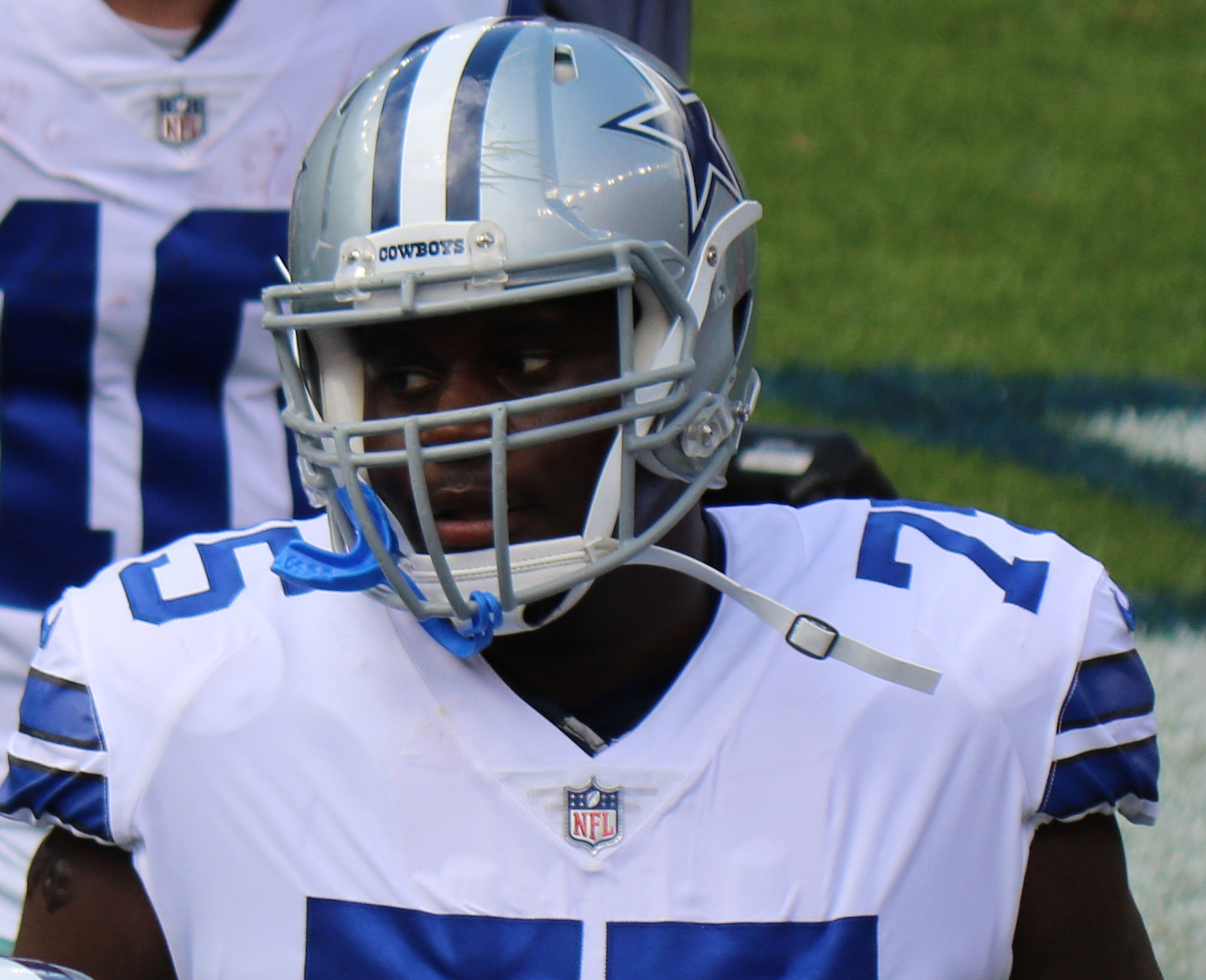
- Bell with the Dallas Cowboys in 2017

No. 77, 76, 75, 74
- Position: Offensive tackle

Personal information
- Born: January 17, 1989 (age 37); Greenville, Texas, U.S.
- Listed height: 6 ft 5 in (1.96 m)
- Listed weight: 320 lb (145 kg)

Career information
- High school: Greenville
- College: New Mexico (2007–2010)
- NFL draft: 2011: undrafted

Career history
- Carolina Panthers (2011–2014); Tennessee Titans (2015–2016); Dallas Cowboys (2017); Green Bay Packers (2018)

Career NFL statistics
- Games played: 102
- Games started: 83
- Stats at Pro Football Reference

Byron Michael Bell (born January 17, 1989) is an American former professional football player who was an offensive tackle in the National Football League (NFL). He played college football for the New Mexico Lobos, and was signed by the Carolina Panthers as an undrafted free agent in 2011.

== Early life ==
Bell attended Greenville High School, where he played offensive tackle for the Lions football team. He also was a Golden Gloves boxer, but gave up the sport as a senior, when he started being recruited by colleges. He received All-state honors as a senior.

He accepted a football scholarship from the University of New Mexico. As a freshman, he played in one game and missed the rest of the season with a knee injury. The next year, he started 12 games at right tackle, while allowing only 3 sacks and helping the team to average 204.9 rushing yards per game, ranking third in the conference and 16th in the nation.

As a junior, he was moved to left tackle and started 12 games, but was a part of a team that only won one contest. As a senior, he started 12 games and received the team's outstanding offensive lineman award, but the team again won only one contest. He finished his college career after appearing in 37 games with 36 starts.

== Professional career ==
Pre-draft measurables
Height	Weight	40-yard dash	10-yard split	20-yard split	20-yard shuttle	Three-cone drill	Vertical jump	Broad jump	Bench press
6 5 1/4	339 lb (154 kg)	5.36 s	1.76 s	3.06 s	4.76 s	7.69 s	30 1/2	8 ft 6 in (2.59 m)	20 reps
All values are from Pro Day

=== Carolina Panthers ===
After going undrafted in the 2011 NFL draft, Bell signed with the Carolina Panthers. As a rookie, he was named the starter at right tackle in the second game after Jeff Otah sustained a concussion in the season opener. He returned to a backup role until the seventh game, when Otah was placed on injured reserve because of a knee and back injury. Bell appeared in 16 games with 12 starts.

In 2012, he opened as the team's first-string right tackle ahead of Otah in Organized Team Activities and remained in that role after Otah was traded on July 23. He started at right guard in the sixth game against the Dallas Cowboys and moved back to tackle for the rest of the season. He appeared 16 games with 15 starts.

In 2013, he played 16 games with 14 starts at right tackle, but struggled in pass protection. Against the Buffalo Bills, he allowed 3.5 sacks (part of a 4.5 sack record for a Panthers opponent) against defensive end Mario Williams in a 23–24 loss. The following week he bounced back and did not allow a sack in a 38–0 win against the New York Giants.

In 2014, with the retirement of Jordan Gross, he was thrust into the left tackle position. He started 17 games including two playoff contests, but struggled even more than in the previous year. He missed the ninth game against the New Orleans Saints with a knee injury. He wasn't re-signed after the season.

=== Tennessee Titans ===
On April 22, 2015, he was signed as a free agent by the Tennessee Titans, to provide depth in the wake of Michael Roos' retirement and Taylor Lewan's move to left tackle. He started all 16 games for the first time of his career, splitting time between left guard and right tackle. On May 24, 2016, Bell suffered a dislocated left ankle during OTAs and was ruled out for the entire season.

=== Dallas Cowboys ===
On March 24, 2017, he signed a one-year contract with the Dallas Cowboys, to provide depth after right tackle Doug Free retired and left guard Ronald Leary was lost in free agency. During preseason he competed for the open left guard position. He began the regular season as the Cowboys' backup swing tackle, until Chaz Green returned to that role after being passed on the depth chart at left guard by Jonathan Cooper in the sixth game against the San Francisco 49ers.

In Week 9 against the Atlanta Falcons, he replaced Green in the third quarter at left tackle, who up to that point had allowed five sacks to defensive end Adrian Clayborn. Bell allowed one more sack, even though the Cowboys coaches were criticized for not adjusting their game plan to stop Clayborn. Green would not recover from the debacle and did not play another snap for the rest of the year, with Bell starting the last 2 games at left tackle in place of an injured Tyron Smith. He was not re-signed after the season.

=== Green Bay Packers ===
On May 30, 2018, the Green Bay Packers signed Bell to a one-year, $1.6 million contract that included a $500,000 signing bonus. He suffered a knee injury on December 2, 2018 during a 20–17 loss to the Arizona Cardinals, and was placed on injured reserve on December 12. Bell played in 12 games for the Packers in 2018, starting nine of those games. He did not commit a single penalty all season, and allowed only 1.5 sacks prior to the injury.
