= Earl Thomas (wide receiver) =

American football player (1948–2020)

No. 82, 89
- Position: Wide receiver

Personal information
- Born: October 4, 1948; Greenville, Texas, U.S.
- Died: July 4, 2020 (aged 71); Houston, Texas, U.S.
- Listed height: 6 ft 3 in (1.91 m)
- Listed weight: 224 lb (102 kg)

Career information
- High school: Greenville
- College: Houston
- NFL draft: 1971: 6th round, 135th overall pick

Career history
- Chicago Bears (1971–1973); St. Louis Cardinals (1974–1975); Houston Oilers (1976)

Career NFL statistics
- Games played: 71
- Receptions: 106
- Receiving yards: 1,651
- Touchdowns: 14
- Stats at Pro Football Reference

Earl Lewis Thomas (October 4, 1948 – July 4, 2020) was an American professional football player who was a wide receiver in the National Football League (NFL). He was born in Greenville, Texas, and played college ball at the University of Houston. Thomas played six seasons for the Chicago Bears, the St. Louis Cardinals, and the Houston Oilers.

Selected by the Chicago Bears in the sixth round of the 1971 NFL Draft, Thomas spent three years in Chicago before moving to the St. Louis Cardinals in 1974. He immediately made an impact, helping guide the team to consecutive NFC East titles in 1974 and 1975. On December 21, 1974, he etched his name into team history by scoring the St. Louis Cardinals' first playoff touchdown against the Minnesota Vikings.

After posting a strong 17.9 yards per catch in 1975, a fallout with Cardinals management—combined with the emergence of wide receiver Ike Harris—prompted a trade to the Green Bay Packers following the season.

His brothers Mike Thomas and Jimmy Thomas also played in the NFL.
