= Greenville Independent School District =

School district in Texas, United States

Address
- 4004 Moulton Greenville, Texas, 75401-5103; United States

District information
- Type: Independent school district
- Grades: Pre-K–12
- Superintendent: Dr. Joe Lopez
- School board: District 1 Anne Haynes; District 2 Trena Stafford; District 3 Kim Butcher; District 4 Tish Woodruff; District 5 John C. Kelso; District 6 Slack Brown; District 7 Roger Livingston
- Schools: 10
- NCES District ID: 4821720

Students and staff
- Enrollment: 5,477
- Teachers: 399.58
- Student–teacher ratio: 13.71

Other information
- Website: www.greenvilleisd.com

Greenville Independent School District (Greenville ISD or GISD) is a public school district based in Greenville, Texas, United States. Since March 2024, Dr. Joe Lopez is the superintendent.

In 2009, the school district was rated "academically acceptable" by the Texas Education Agency. As of the school year 2021-2022, its accountability rating is C, on the scale of A-F. It has 5320 students of which 16.4% are African American, 2,498 are Hispanic and 1574 are White.

Travis Elementary School was a 1987-88 National Blue Ribbon School.

== Schools ==
Secondary schools:

- Greenville High School
- Houston Education Center
- Greenville Middle School
- Travis 6th Grade School

Elementary schools:

- Bowie Elementary School
- Carver Elementary School
- Crockett Elementary School
- Lamar Elementary School
- Travis Elementary School

Pre-K

- L. P. Waters Early Childhood Center

== Forensic audit ==
In December 2017, the Texas Association of School Business Officials found problems with the school district's finances. Residents urged the school board to do a forensic audit, but Superintendent Demetrus Liggins initially did not think a forensic audit was necessary. In early 2018, the school board hired an investigator to perform a forensic audit.

In April 2018, the investigator announced that he could not find proof of payment for "$54 million out of the $72 million bond approved by voters in May 2014". According to the investigator, "former GISD officials engaged in cronyism, misappropriation of payroll assets, misconduct to include mismanagement and abuse of position, and theft by gift of tax payer monies". Days later, the school district board directed the superintendent to "report all alleged acts of misappropriation, whether outlined in the forensic audit or not, to the appropriate law enforcement". The Texas Attorney General's office was asked to investigate the matter. As of June 2018, the Attorney General will not release information about the audit until its investigation is complete.

== Tax swap and drop ==
In July 2018, the district ran a phone survey to gauge public opinion about tax swap and drop. The survey included benefits of the proposal, but it did not mention that taxes would be lower without it. In October 2018, the district updated its website to include this extra information. In August 2018, the district school board proposed a tax swap and drop measure, to be approved by voters in the 2018 midterm election (November 6, 2018).

The proposal was narrowly approved, with 4,161 (52.39%) people voting in favor of it and 3,776 (47.61%) people voting against it.

== First Amendment lawsuit ==
In October 2018, the district was facing a lawsuit for allegedly violating First Amendment rights of residents. The district deleted comments on its Facebook page that were unfavorable to the district, including comments by a former school board member. After the district apologized, the legal challenge was rescinded.
