= Greenville, Texas =

- City
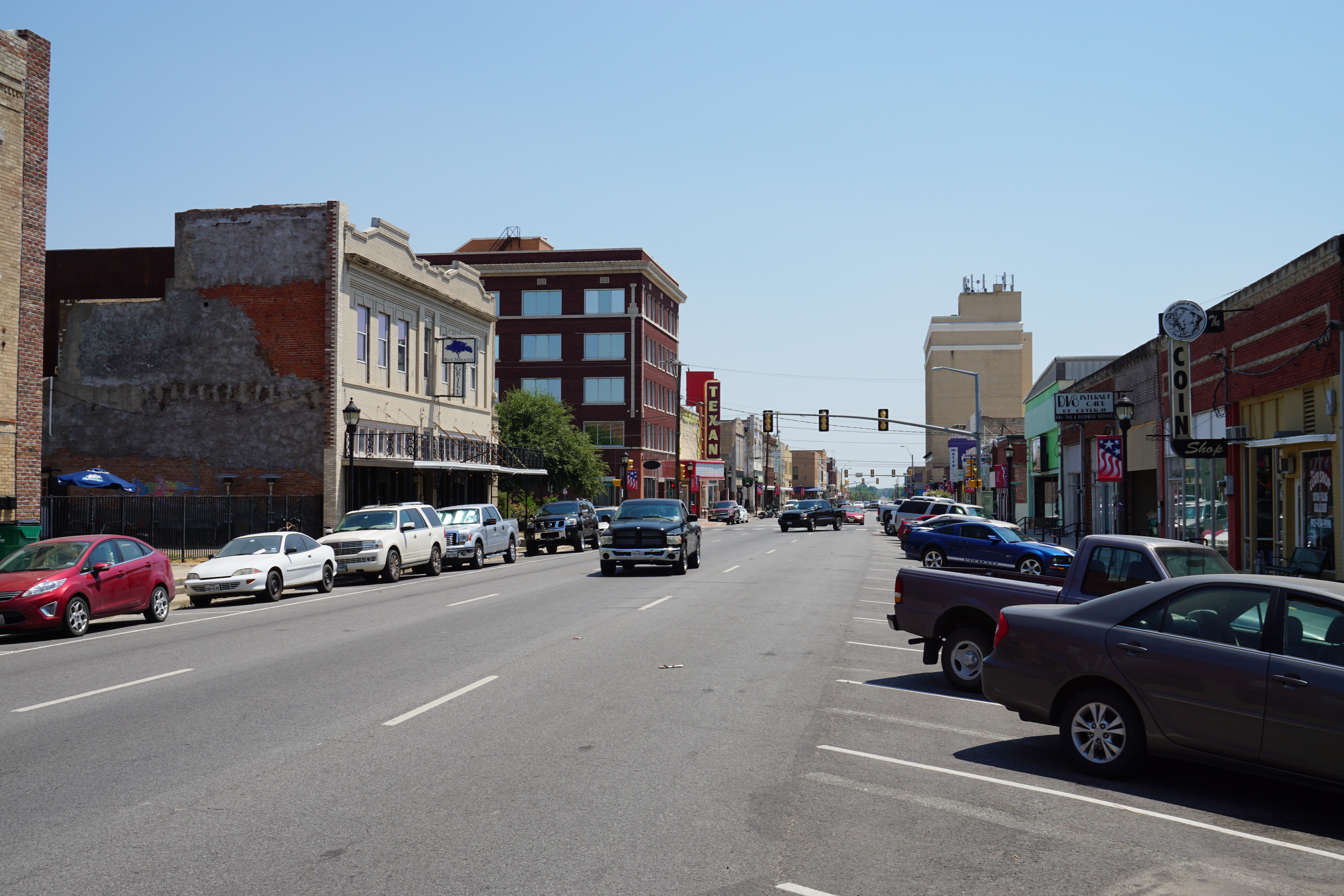
- Lee Street in downtown Greenville
- Motto(s): "Rich Heritage, Vibrant Future"
- Location of Greenville in Hunt County, Texas

- Location within Texas Location within the United States
- Coordinates: 33°07′34″N 96°06′35″W
- Country: United States
- State: Texas
- County: Hunt
- Incorporated: April 13, 1852 (174 years ago)
- Named for: Thomas J. Green

Government
  - Type: Council-Manager
  - City Council: Mayor Jerry Ransom; Place 1 Ramon Rodriguez; Place 2 Thomas J Goss; Place 3 Philip Spencer; Place 4 Tim Kruse; Place 5 Ben Collins; Place 6 Kenneth Freeman
  - City Manager: Summer Spurlock

Area
  - Total: 33.11 sq mi (85.75 km^{2})
  - Land: 32.29 sq mi (83.62 km^{2})
  - Water: 0.82 sq mi (2.12 km^{2})
- Elevation: 564 ft (172 m)

Population (2020)
  - Total: 28,164
  - Estimate (2025): 37,069
  - Density: 872.3/sq mi (336.8/km^{2})
- Time zone: UTC-6 (Central (CST))
  - Summer (DST): UTC-5 (CDT)
- ZIP codes: 75401–75404
- Area codes: 903, 430
- FIPS code: 48-30920
- GNIS feature ID: 2410660
- Website: www.greenvilletx.gov

Greenville (locally /ˈɡriːnvəl/ GREEN-vəl) is the county seat of and the most populous city in Hunt County, Texas, United States. As the "Gateway to East Texas", Greenville is located in Northeast Texas approximately 50 miles (80 km) northeast of Dallas and 30 miles (48 km) west of Sulphur Springs. As of the 2020 census, the city population was 28,164.

Greenville was named for Thomas J. Green, a significant contributor to the founding of the Texas Republic.

== History ==
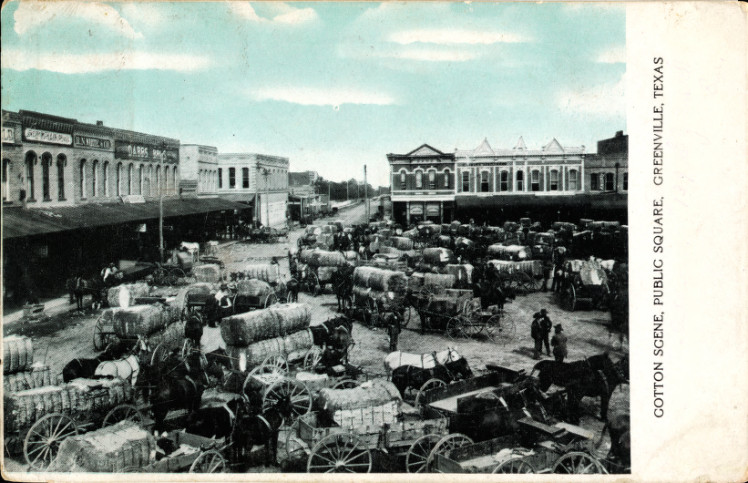
Cotton scene, public square, Greenville, Texas (postcard, c. 1908)

Greenville was founded in 1846. The city was named after Thomas J. Green, a significant contributor to the establishment of the Texas Republic. He later became a member of the Congress of the Texas Republic.

As the Civil War loomed, Greenville was divided over the issue of secession, as were several area towns and counties. Greenville attorney and State Senator Martin D. Hart was a prominent Unionist. He formed a company of men who fought for the Union in Arkansas, even as other Greenville residents fought for the Confederacy. The divided nature of Greenville and Hunt County is noted by a historical marker in "The SPOT" Park at 2800 Lee Street in downtown Greenville. In the post-Civil War era, Greenville's economy became partly dependent on cotton, as the local economy entered a period of transition.

With a population of 12,384 in the 1920 census, the city was the 20th-most populous city in Texas at the time.

In World War II, the Mexican Escuadrón 201 was stationed in Greenville while training at nearby Majors Field.

Greenville was notorious for a large sign, installed on July 7, 1921, over Lee Street, the main street in the downtown district, between the train station and the bus station in the 1920s to 1960s. The sign read: "Welcome to Greenville, The Blackest Land, The Whitest People." However, the meaning of the phrase "whitest people" lent to an ambiguous interpretation. One meaning the goodness of the citizens and the other carrying racial overtones. The original sign was taken down and placed into storage on April 13, 1965, possibly at the urging of Texas Governor John Connally, who had made a visit to the town weeks before. In 1968, Greenville's Sybil Maddux had the sign reinstalled, with the wording modified to read "The Greatest People"; the original sign is in the collection of the Audie Murphy American Cotton Museum.

In 1957, Greenville annexed the small town of Peniel, which had been founded in 1899 as a Pentecostal Church of the Nazarene community centered around Texas Holiness University. The annexation was approved by the citizens of Peniel, which at the time had a population around 157.

On May 12, 2011, a white buffalo was born near Greenville during a thunderstorm on the ranch of Arby Littlesoldier, who identified himself as a great-great-grandson of Sitting Bull. A public naming ceremony and dedication was held on June 29, 2011, during which the male calf was officially given the name "Lightning Medicine Cloud". However, on August 21, 2012, Lightning Medicine Cloud died. The sheriff's department declared it had died from a bacterial infection, but the owners disagree, claiming that the buffalo was allegedly skinned by an unknown party.

== Geography ==
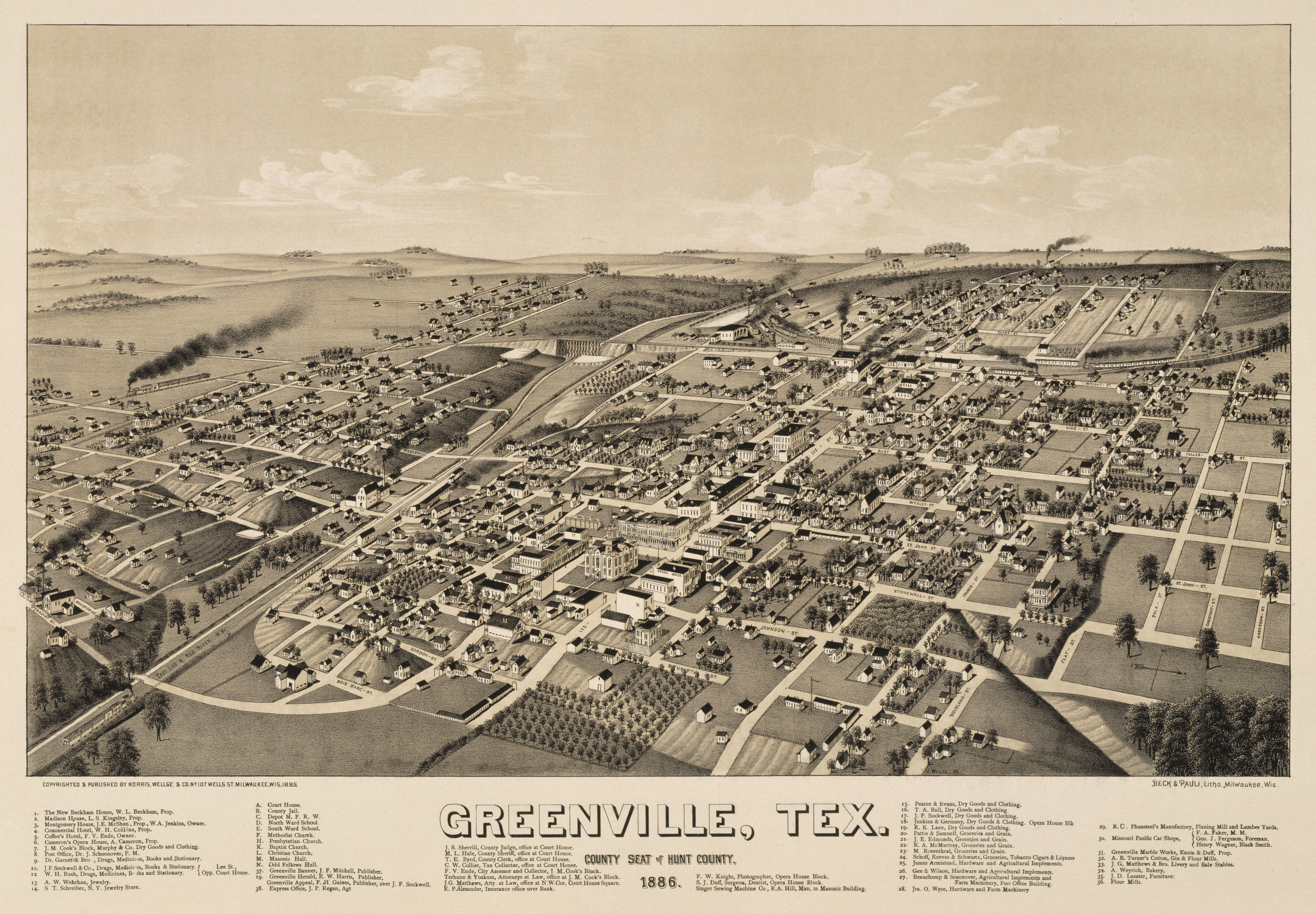
Panoramic map of the city in 1886 with list of landmarks

Greenville is located in Northeast Texas in central Hunt County, in the heart of the Texas Blackland Prairies and the East Central Texas forests, 50 miles (80 km) northeast of Dallas and approximately 45 miles (72 km) south of the Texas/Oklahoma border, on the eastern edge of the Dallas/Fort Worth Metroplex, and the western edge of East Texas.

According to the U.S. Census Bureau, Greenville has a total area of 33.4 square miles (86.6 km^{2}), of which 32.6 square miles (84.5 km^{2}) are land and 0.1 square miles (0.2 km^{2}), or 2.46%, is covered by water. The Cowleech Fork of the Sabine River flows through the northeastern part of the city.

=== Climate ===
Greenville has a humid subtropical climate (Köppen Cfa) with long, very hot summers and short, mild winters. Due to its location on the Northeast Texas prairies, its weather is typically humid with mild precipitation.

Climate data for Greenville, Texas (1991–2020 normals, extremes 1900–present)
Month	Jan	Feb	Mar	Apr	May	Jun	Jul	Aug	Sep	Oct	Nov	Dec	Year
Record high °F (°C)	90 (32)	95 (35)	95 (35)	101 (38)	104 (40)	109 (43)	113 (45)	116 (47)	109 (43)	103 (39)	91 (33)	87 (31)	116 (47)
Mean maximum °F (°C)	74.6 (23.7)	78.0 (25.6)	82.8 (28.2)	87.2 (30.7)	92.6 (33.7)	97.4 (36.3)	102.0 (38.9)	103.8 (39.9)	99.3 (37.4)	92.3 (33.5)	82.3 (27.9)	75.8 (24.3)	104.4 (40.2)
Mean daily maximum °F (°C)	57.8 (14.3)	61.7 (16.5)	69.3 (20.7)	77.4 (25.2)	84.6 (29.2)	92.6 (33.7)	97.1 (36.2)	98.3 (36.8)	91.3 (32.9)	80.7 (27.1)	68.3 (20.2)	59.5 (15.3)	78.2 (25.7)
Daily mean °F (°C)	45.5 (7.5)	49.4 (9.7)	56.7 (13.7)	64.8 (18.2)	73.2 (22.9)	81.4 (27.4)	85.6 (29.8)	85.8 (29.9)	78.4 (25.8)	67.3 (19.6)	55.9 (13.3)	47.5 (8.6)	66.0 (18.9)
Mean daily minimum °F (°C)	33.3 (0.7)	37.2 (2.9)	44.2 (6.8)	52.2 (11.2)	61.9 (16.6)	70.2 (21.2)	74.1 (23.4)	73.3 (22.9)	65.6 (18.7)	54.0 (12.2)	43.4 (6.3)	35.5 (1.9)	53.7 (12.1)
Mean minimum °F (°C)	17.8 (−7.9)	21.8 (−5.7)	26.5 (−3.1)	36.8 (2.7)	46.5 (8.1)	60.0 (15.6)	66.3 (19.1)	64.9 (18.3)	51.8 (11.0)	38.8 (3.8)	27.6 (−2.4)	21.6 (−5.8)	15.6 (−9.1)
Record low °F (°C)	−4 (−20)	−4 (−20)	8 (−13)	26 (−3)	31 (−1)	48 (9)	55 (13)	49 (9)	36 (2)	21 (−6)	13 (−11)	−3 (−19)	−4 (−20)
Average precipitation inches (mm)	3.16 (80)	3.46 (88)	4.42 (112)	4.12 (105)	5.79 (147)	4.16 (106)	3.15 (80)	2.39 (61)	3.84 (98)	4.96 (126)	3.58 (91)	3.98 (101)	47.01 (1,194)
Average snowfall inches (cm)	0.0 (0.0)	0.1 (0.25)	0.0 (0.0)	0.0 (0.0)	0.0 (0.0)	0.0 (0.0)	0.0 (0.0)	0.0 (0.0)	0.0 (0.0)	0.0 (0.0)	0.0 (0.0)	0.0 (0.0)	0.1 (0.25)
Average precipitation days (≥ 0.01 in)	6.4	7.0	7.5	6.7	7.2	6.6	4.9	4.6	5.6	6.6	6.0	5.7	74.8
Average snowy days (≥ 0.1 in)	0.1	0.1	0.0	0.0	0.0	0.0	0.0	0.0	0.0	0.0	0.1	0.0	0.3
Source: NOAA

== Demographics ==
Historical population
Census	Pop.	Note	%±
1890	4,330		—
1900	6,860		58.4%
1910	8,850		29.0%
1920	12,384		39.9%
1930	12,407		0.2%
1940	13,995		12.8%
1950	14,727		5.2%
1960	19,087		29.6%
1970	22,043		15.5%
1980	22,161		0.5%
1990	23,071		4.1%
2000	23,960		3.9%
2010	25,557		6.7%
2020	28,164		10.2%
2025 (est.)	37,069		31.6%
U.S. Decennial Census

=== 2020 census ===
As of the 2020 census, Greenville had a population of 28,164 people, 10,652 households, and 6,602 families. The median age was 34.7 years; 25.8% of residents were under 18 and 15.5% were 65 or older. For every 100 females, there were 95.1 males, and for every 100 females 18 and over, there were 90.9 males 18 and over.

About 94.2% of residents lived in urban areas, while 5.8% lived in rural areas.

Of the 10,652 households in Greenville, 34.4% had children under 18 living in them. Of all households, 42.2% were married-couple households, 19.8% were households with a male householder and no spouse or partner present, and 30.9% were households with a female householder and no spouse or partner present. About 29.4% of all households were made up of individuals, and 11.9% had someone living alone who was 65 or older.

Of the 11,666 housing units, 8.7% were vacant. The homeowner vacancy rate was 1.7% and the rental vacancy rate was 8.0%.

Racial composition as of the 2020 census
Race	Number	Percent
White	16,442	58.4%
Black or African American	3,995	14.2%
American Indian and Alaska Native	329	1.2%
Asian	379	1.3%
Native Hawaiian and other Pacific Islander	45	0.2%
Some other race	3,252	11.5%
Two or more races	3,722	13.2%
Hispanic or Latino (of any race)	7,882	28.0%

== Economy ==
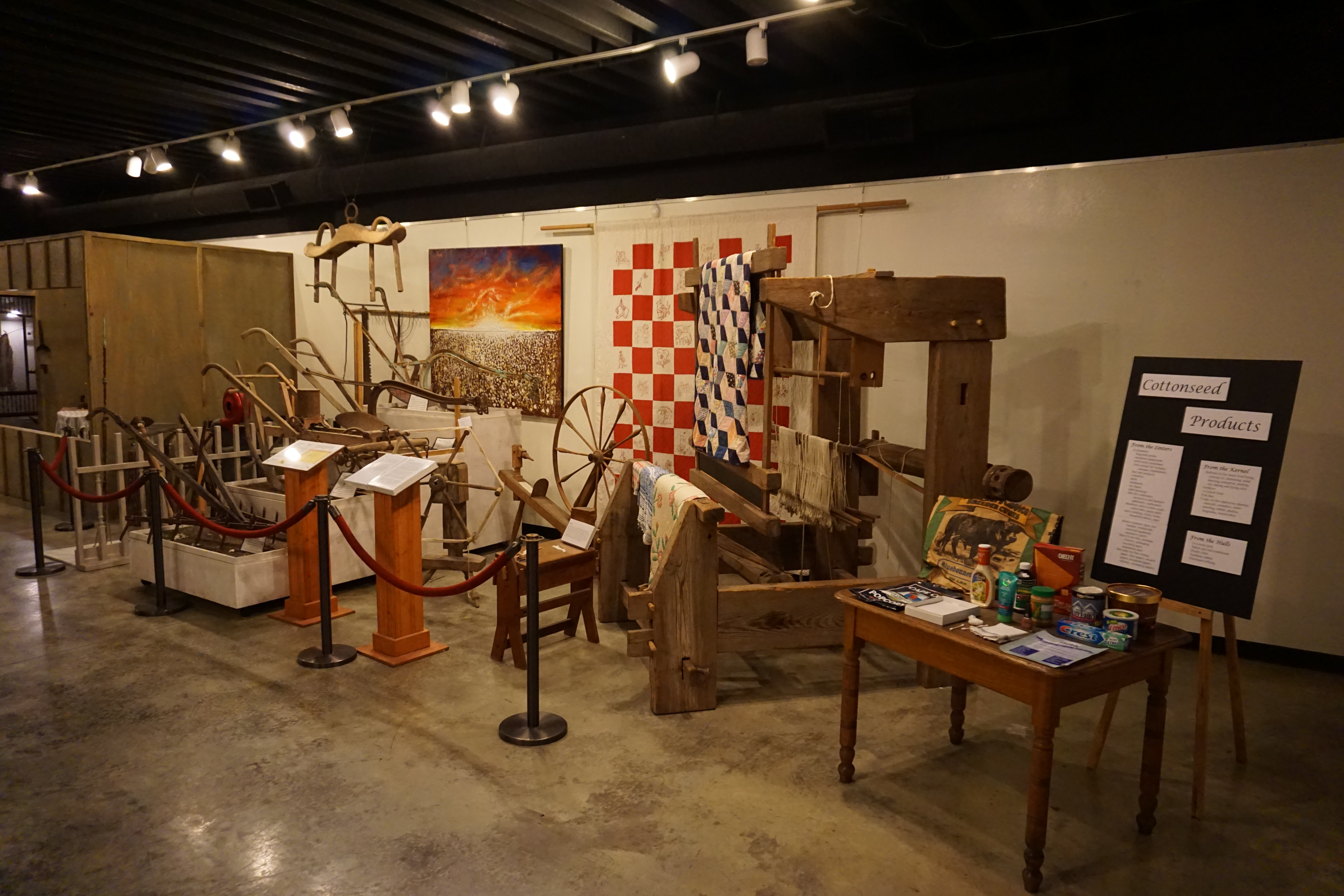
The Hunt County cotton exhibit at the Audie Murphy American Cotton Museum

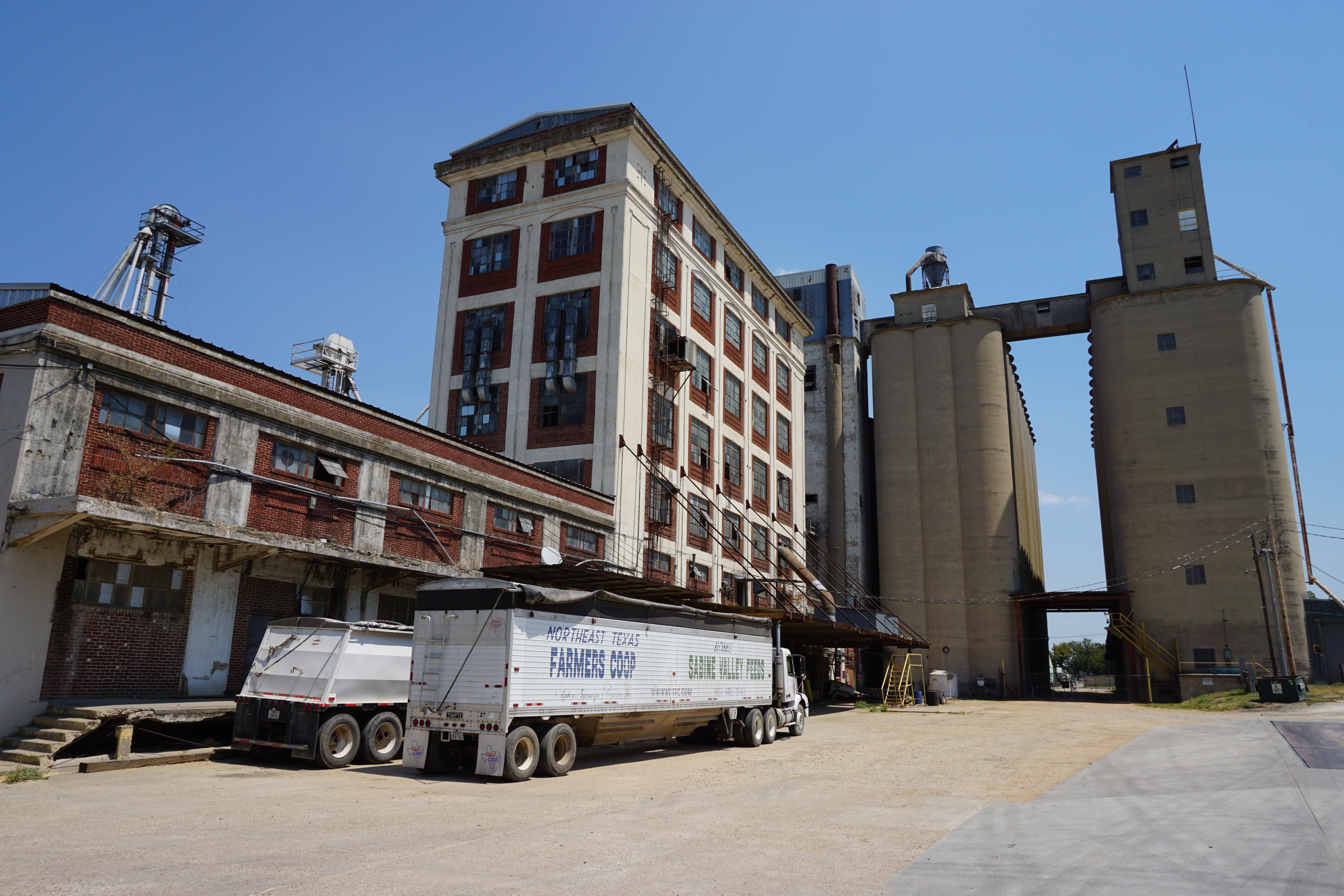
The Northeast Texas Farmers Co-op Sabine Valley Feeds mill in Greenville

In early years, Hunt County was known as the cotton capital of the world. The world's largest inland cotton compress was located in Greenville until it was destroyed by fire in the mid-1900s.

Currently, the largest industry is L3Harris Mission Integration Division (MID, formerly L3, E-Systems, Raytheon Intelligence and Information Systems (RIIS, IIS)) a major U.S. defense contractor located at Majors Airport. This airport, created in 1942 and initially financed by the local Rotary Club, was used as a training base for P-47 Thunderbolt fighter pilots in World War II and since then has served as a focal point for economic growth in Greenville.

Tourism is playing an increasing role in the local economy, with attractions such as Splash Kingdom Water Park, located on Interstate 30, and the redeveloping historic downtown featuring Landon Winery and the restored vintage Texan Theater, which opened in 2014. Greenville is also known for its saddle-making industry.

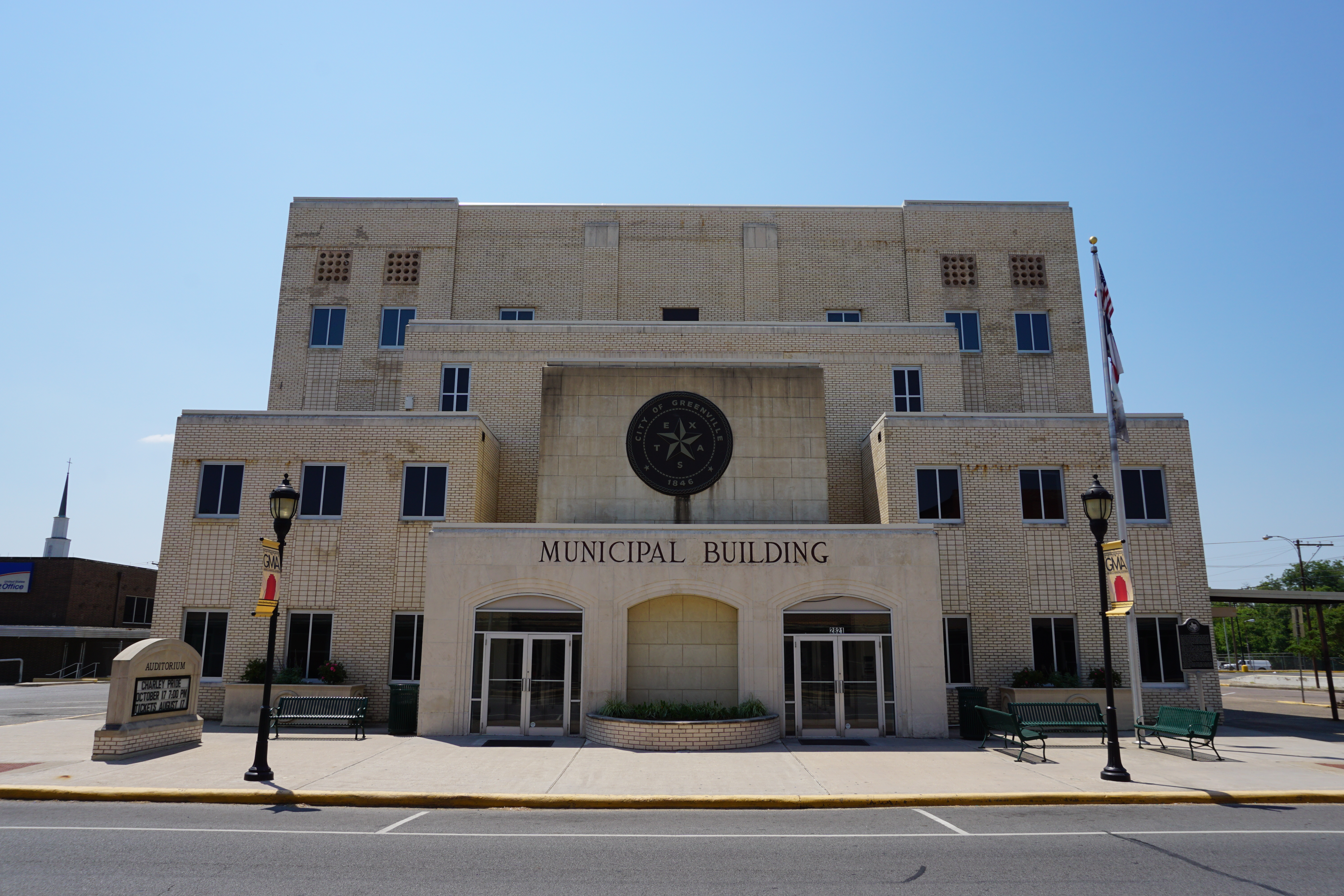
Greenville Municipal Auditorium in August 2015

According to the city's 2022–2023 Comprehensive Annual Financial Report, the top employers in the city are:

#	Employer	# of Employees
1	L3Harris	6,500
2	Hunt Regional Medical Center	1,100
3	Greenville Independent School District	844
4	McKesson	500
5	Hunt County	350
6	Solvay	350
7	City of Greenville	301
8	Masonite International	250
9	Walmart Supercenter	250
10	Cytec Engineered Materials	225
11	Weatherford International	225
12	Innovation First	225
13	Raytheon	200
14	West Rock	130

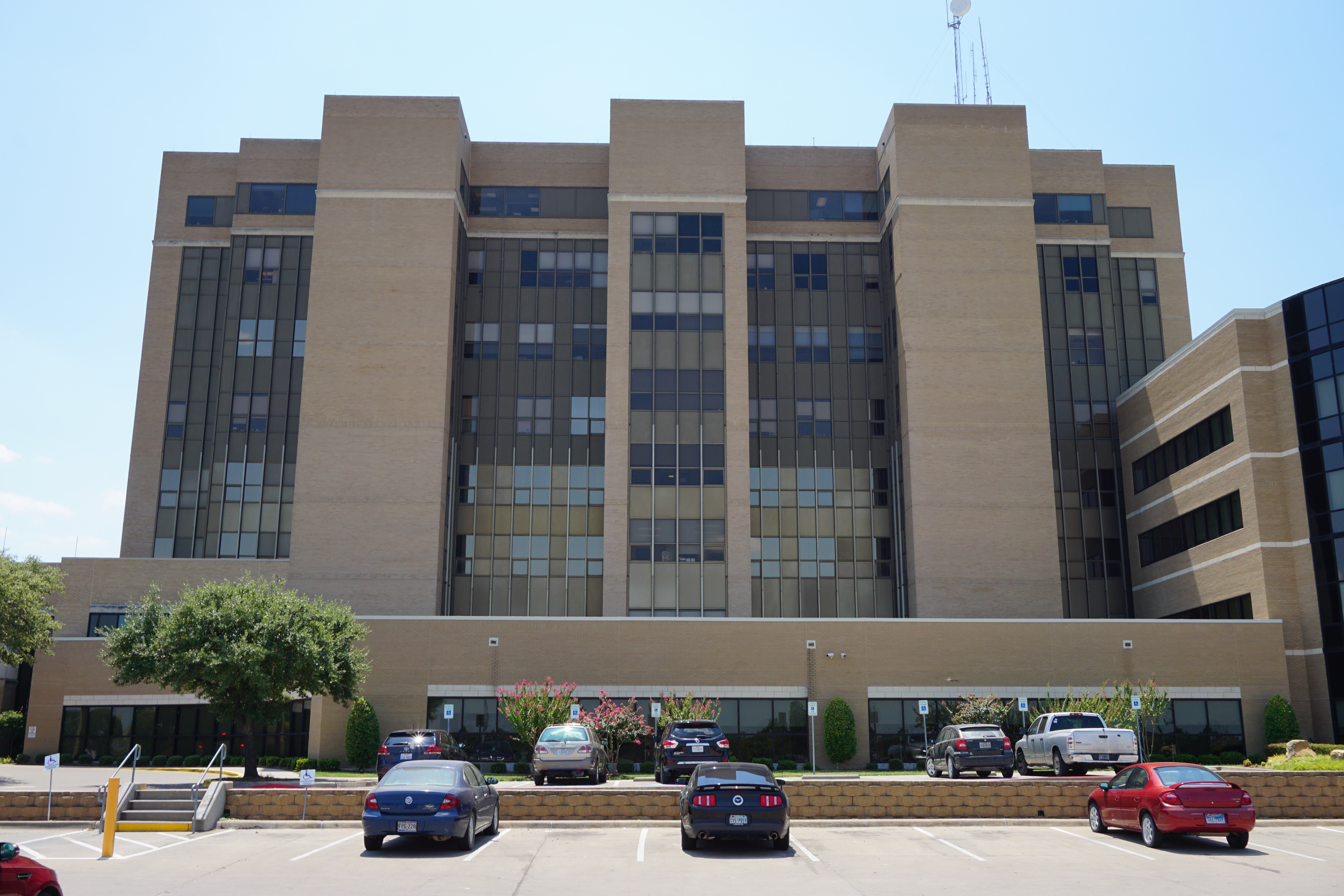
Hunt Regional Medical Center

Entertainment includes multiple concerts at the Greenville Municipal Auditorium. The Greenville Chamber Music Society Concert Series features the Greenville Pops Orchestra for three concerts and eight additional jazz and classical concerts per year; community theatre productions are performed at the Greenville Family Theatre and Greenville Theatre Works. The historic Texan Theatre brings in multiple concerts each year, and local clubs with musical entertainment, live theater in nearby Commerce, local art shows, and a bowling alley offer year-round entertainment.

Tourism draws include the Audie Murphy/American Cotton Museum and the historic downtown area, which includes wineries, antique malls, public gardens, boutique shopping, and regular events at the 1,400-seat Greenville Municipal Auditorium. The Lee Street Jamboree is held the third weekend each September and includes the Cotton Patch Challenge Bicycle Ride. Each year, the community and city sponsor a Christmas Parade, Fourth of July Parade, and Veteran's Day Parade. In November each year, the Bob Wills Fiddle Festival is held downtown and at the Greenville Municipal Auditorium. Other annual events include the Hunt County Festival of the Arts, Lee Street Jamboree, the Hunt County Fair, Lit-Con, the Bottle Rocket Bash on July 4, and multiple local events sponsored by community groups and churches.

Greenville is also home to the Hunt Regional Medical Center.

== Media ==
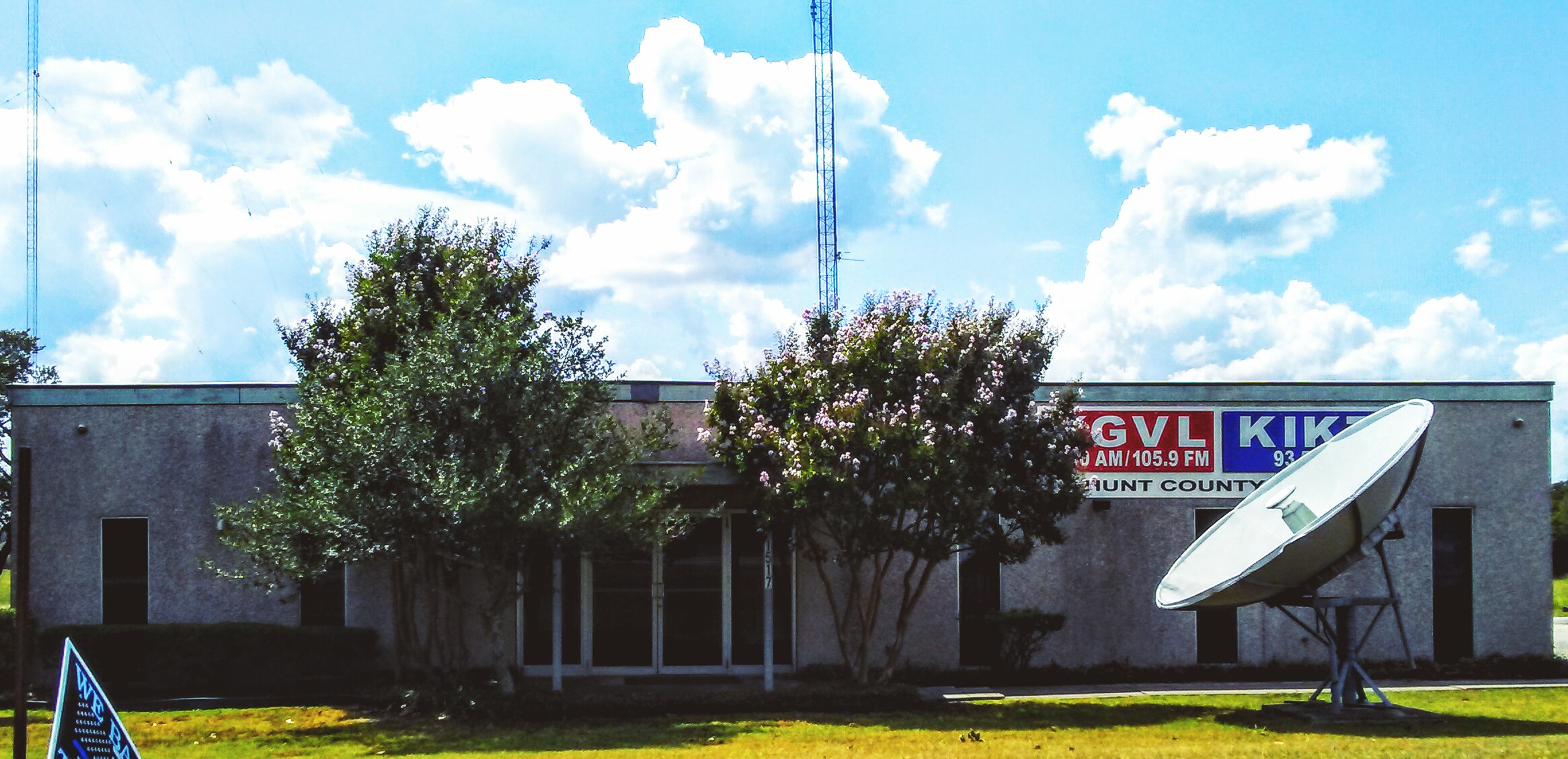
KGVL radio station in Greenville

Greenville is served by Dallas/Fort Worth television stations on local cable and also regular programming.

KGVL radio serves the city of Greenville. KETR in Commerce also serves the city of Greenville due to the proximity of the two cities.

In addition to The Dallas Morning News, which serves the entire Dallas/Fort Worth area, Greenville is served by a local daily newspaper, the Herald-Banner.

== Education ==
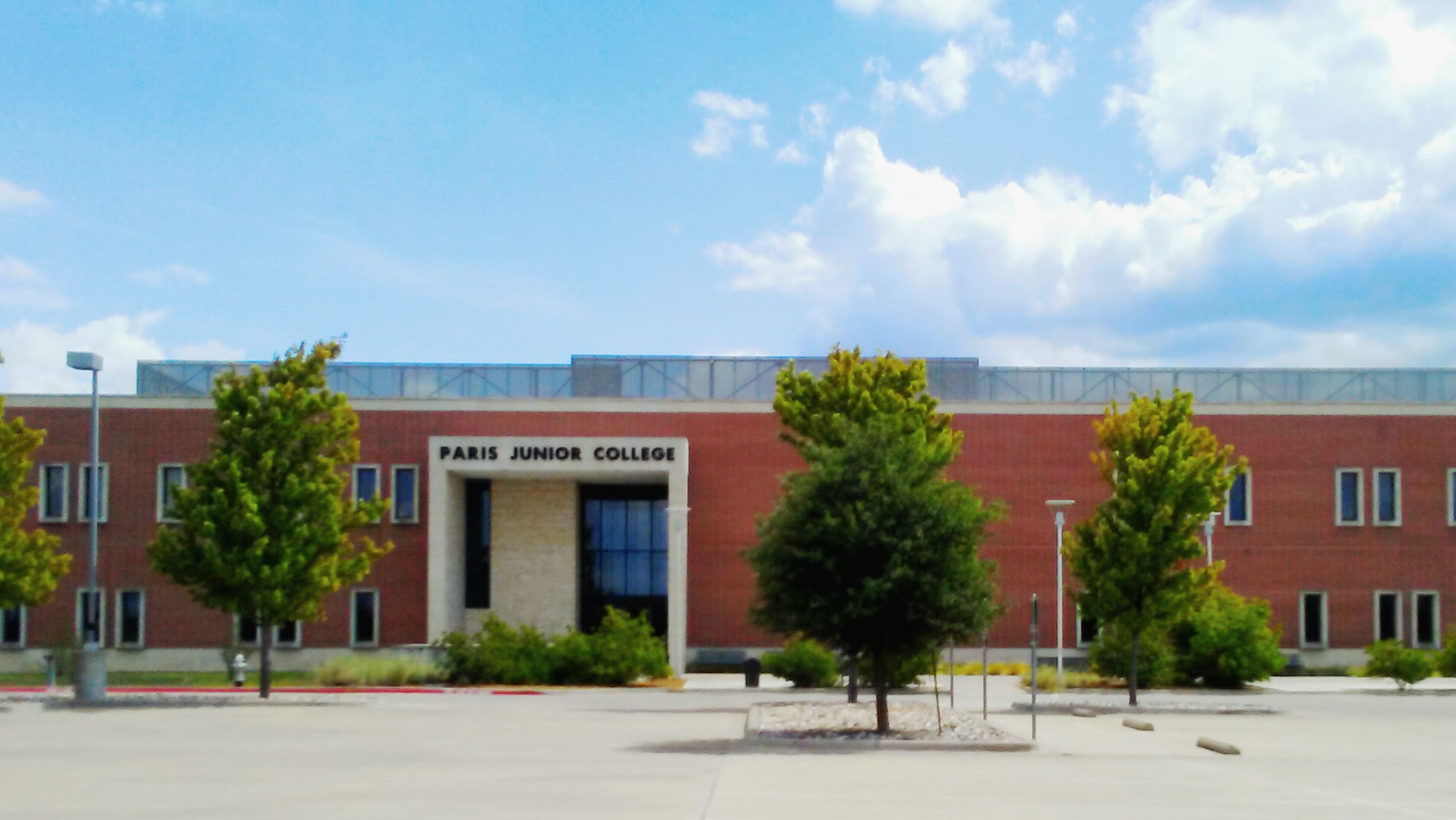
Paris Junior College in Greenville

Primary and secondary education of Greenville is provided by Greenville Independent School District along with a charter school, Pioneer Technology and Arts Academy, and private institutions such as Greenville Christian School.

Postsecondary education is offered through Paris Junior College-Greenville Center. East Texas A&M University, a major university of over 12,000 students, is located 15 miles (24 km) northeast in Commerce.

== Government ==
=== Local government ===
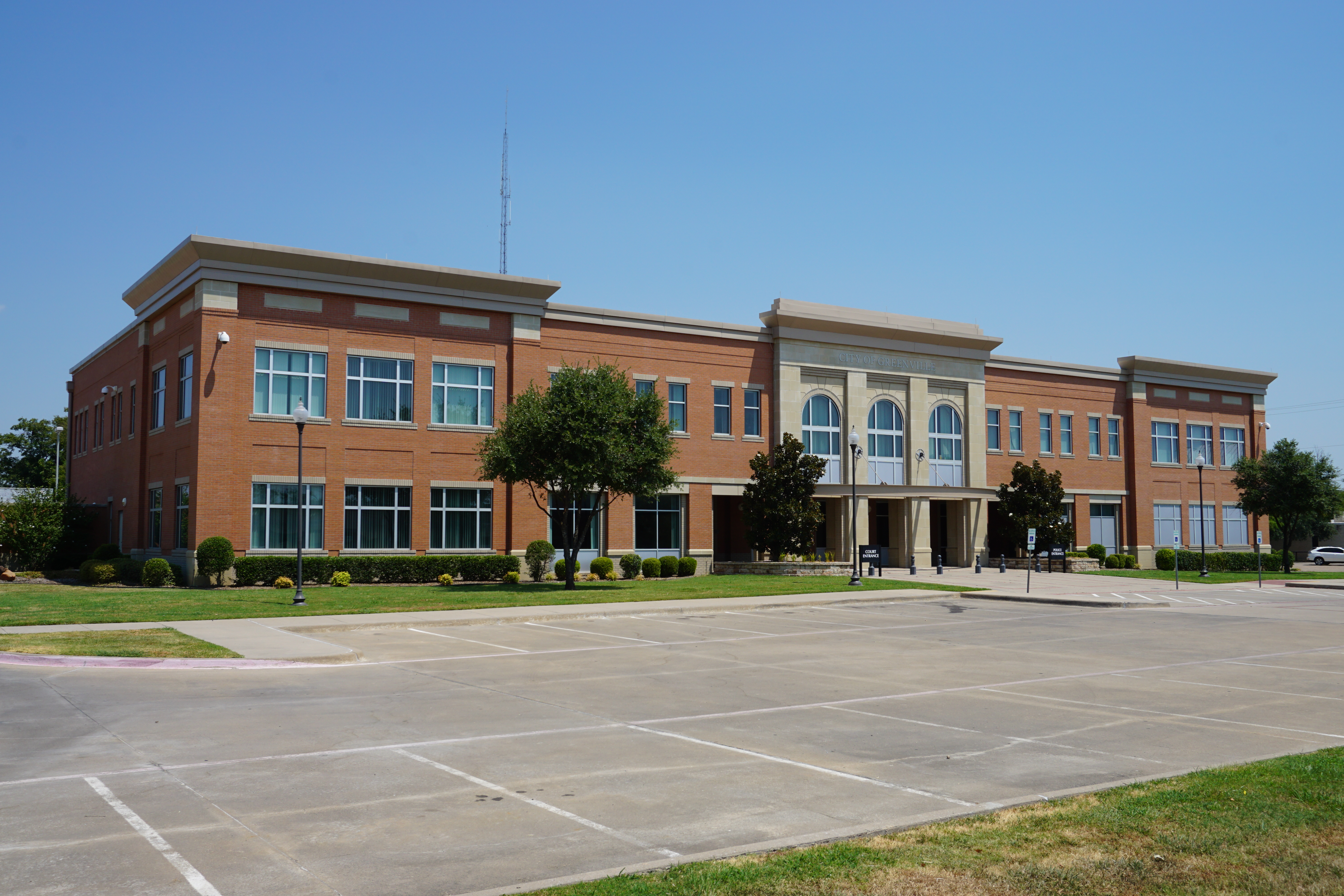
Greenville Police and Courts building in August 2015

According to the city's most recent Comprehensive Annual Financial Report Fund Financial Statements, the city's various funds had $19.9 million in revenues, $21.7 million in expenditures, $10.1 million in total assets, $1.8 million in total liabilities, and $1.4 million in investments.

Greenville is a voluntary member of the North Central Texas Council of Governments, the purpose of which is to coordinate individual and collective local governments and facilitate regional solutions, eliminate unnecessary duplication, and enable joint decisions.

=== State government ===
Greenville is represented in the Texas Senate by Republican Angela Paxton, District 8, and in the Texas House of Representatives by Republican Brent Money, District 2.

The Texas Department of Criminal Justice operates the Greenville District Parole Office in Greenville.

=== Federal government ===
Republicans John Cornyn and Ted Cruz are Texas's U. S. Senators. Before the 2020 redistricting cycle, Greenville was represented by Texas's 4th congressional district for several decades. Since 2021, Greenville has been represented by Republican Keith Self who represents Texas's 3rd congressional district.

The United States Postal Service operates the Greenville, Greenville Finance, and Rolling Hills post offices.

== Transportation ==
=== Roads ===
==== Interstate 30 ====
- Interstate 30 (Martin Luther King Jr. Freeway) is a major route through Greenville. To the west, Interstate 30 goes through Rockwall and Dallas to Fort Worth. To the east, Interstate 30 goes through Sulphur Springs, Mount Pleasant, and Texarkana.

Commercial and residential developments line the interstate from Monty Stratton Parkway through Lamar Street. The frontage roads have recently been converted to one-way for safety due to increased traffic.

==== U.S. highways ====
- U.S. Highway 67 (Martin Luther King Jr. Freeway) runs concurrent with Interstate 30 through Greenville.
- U.S. 69 (Joe Ramsey Boulevard) serves as a partial loop through Greenville. It connects with Celeste, Leonard, and Denison to the north and with Lone Oak, Mineola, and Tyler to the south. U.S. 69 is a four-lane divided highway from U.S. 380 / Texas Highway 302 to just past Business U.S. 69 (Moulton Street).
- U.S. 380 (Joe Ramsey Boulevard/Lee Street) heads west out of Greenville through Farmersville, McKinney, and Denton. U.S. 380 is a four-lane divided highway. Within Greenville city limits it runs mostly concurrent with U.S. 69 along Joe Ramsey Boulevard.
- Business U.S. 69 follows several local streets which serve the northern, downtown, and southern areas of the city. It starts and ends at U.S. 69. The local street names are Rees Street (through Peniel), Sockwell Street (north of downtown), Stonewall Street / Johnson Street (couplet through downtown, where Stonewall is southbound and Johnson is northbound), Park Street (east of downtown), and Moulton Street (south of downtown and over Interstate 30).

==== State highways ====
- Texas Highway 34 (Wesley Street, Wolfe City Drive) serves as a primary north–south route through Greenville and is a main commercial corridor. Connects with Wolfe City to the north and Quinlan to the south.
- Texas Highway 66 (Old Dallas Highway) heads southwest out of the city towards Caddo Mills and Royse City.
- Texas Highway 224 (Commerce Drive) heads northeast out of the city towards Commerce and Cooper.
- Texas Highway Spur 302 (Lee Street / Washington Street) serves as an east–west route through Greenville. It starts at U.S. 69 / U.S. 380 at the west end and ends at Interstate 30 at the east end. The route, mostly on Lee Street, goes through downtown as a couplet, where Lee Street goes eastbound and Washington Street goes westbound.

==== Farm-to-Market roads ====
- Farm Road 118 (Fannin Street) heads north out of Greenville from FM 499 towards Jacobia.
- Farm Road 499 (Forester Street) heads east out of Greenville from Spur 302 going through Campbell and Cumby.
- Farm Road 1569 heads west out of Greenville from a junction with highway 69 towards Merit.
- Farm Road 1570 (Jack Finney Boulevard) serves the southern parts of the city, particularly the L-3 facility / Majors Field Airport.
- Farm Road 2101 heads south out of Greenville from Majors Airport towards Boles Home in Quinlan.

=== Airports ===
The nearest airports with passenger air service are Dallas Love Field (55.4 miles) and Dallas/Fort Worth International Airport (70.0 miles).

Majors Airport is a municipal airport located in Greenville.

=== Public transportation ===
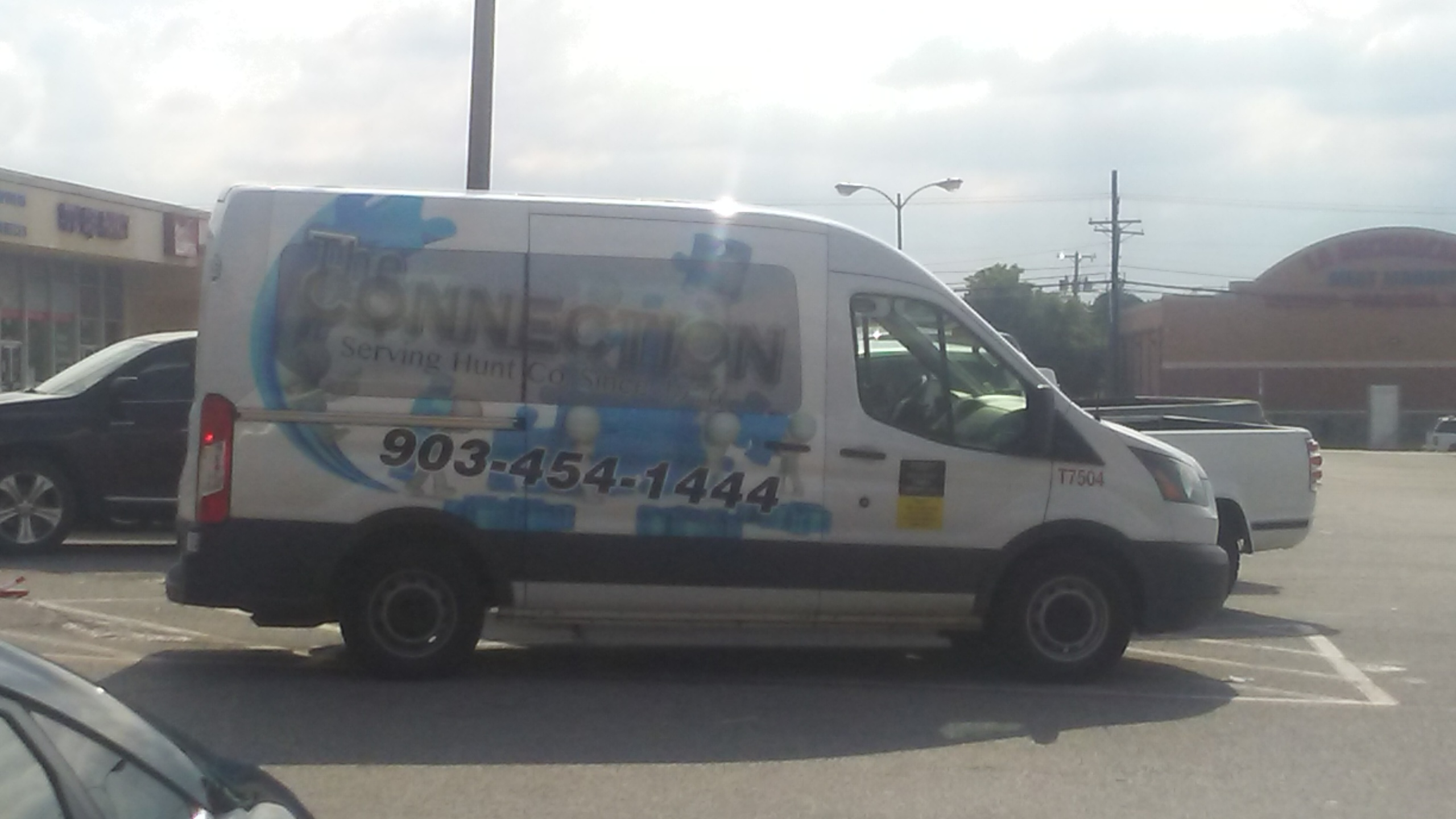
A Connection bus in Greenville

"The Connection" serves Greenville and all of Hunt County. The transit system operates Monday through Friday from 7 am to 7 pm. Reservations have to be made one day in advance. The charge is $2 ($4 round trip) if the passenger is traveling to a place within the same community or city, and $3 ($6 round trip) if the passenger is traveling from one city or community to another within Hunt County. The Connection will take Hunt County residents to Dallas, on a round-trip only basis: passengers are charged $34, and a minimum of three passengers is required.

== Notable people ==
- Byron Bell, player for NFL's Green Bay Packers and Dallas Cowboys
- Yusuf Bey, Black Muslim activist, founder of Your Black Muslim Bakery in Oakland, California
- John Boles, movie and stage actor of the early 20th century
- Ernest Burkhart, one of the perpetrators of the Osage Indian murders under his uncle William King Hale
- Brandon Couts, athlete, Baylor University Hall of Famer who ran professionally and specialized in 400 meter dash
- Kay Granger, Republican politician with 12th congressional district in the U.S. House of Representatives
- Dean E. Hallmark, pilot in the Doolittle Raid of April 18, 1942, on Tokyo
- Mack Harrell, operatic baritone; father of cellist Lynn Harrell
- Stanley Hauerwas, Gilbert T. Rowe Professor of Theological Ethics at Duke Divinity School
- Burt Hooton, Major League Baseball pitcher, member of 1981 World Series champion Dodgers
- V. E. Howard, minister who founded radio's International Gospel Hour
- Ben Kweller, musician
- Haldor Lillenas, prolific hymn writer and Gospel Music Hall of Fame inductee
- George Maddox, former NFL player
- Kimberly McCarthy, convicted murderer
- Bart Millard, lead singer and founder of contemporary Christian band MercyMe
- Robert Neyland, Hall of Fame football coach at Tennessee
- Howie Parker, football player for SMU and the AAFC New York Yankees
- Robert Plunket, author
- Monty Stratton, Major League Baseball pitcher from the 1930s
- Earl Thomas, former NFL wide receiver
- Jimmy Thomas, former running back: San Francisco 49ers
- Mike Thomas, NFL running back: Washington Redskins and San Diego Chargers
- Francia White, opera singer, radio and television personality during 1930s and 1940s
- Buzz Williams, head coach of men's basketball team at Texas A&M University
- Ronny Woodruff, biologist and zoologist

== See also ==
- Audie Murphy American Cotton Museum
- Majors Stadium
- Greenville Club Lake

== Photo gallery ==
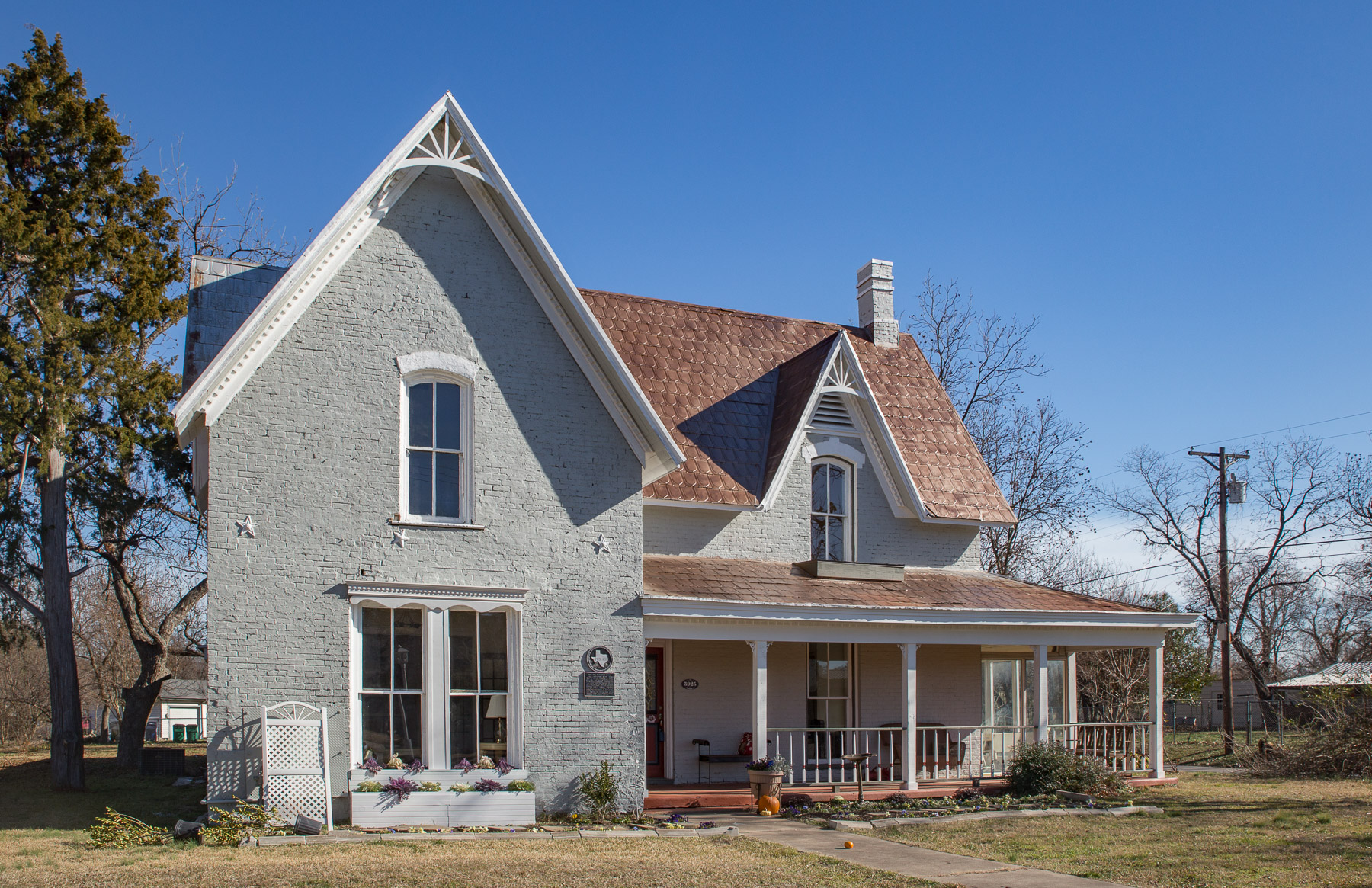
Gen. Hal C. Horton Home

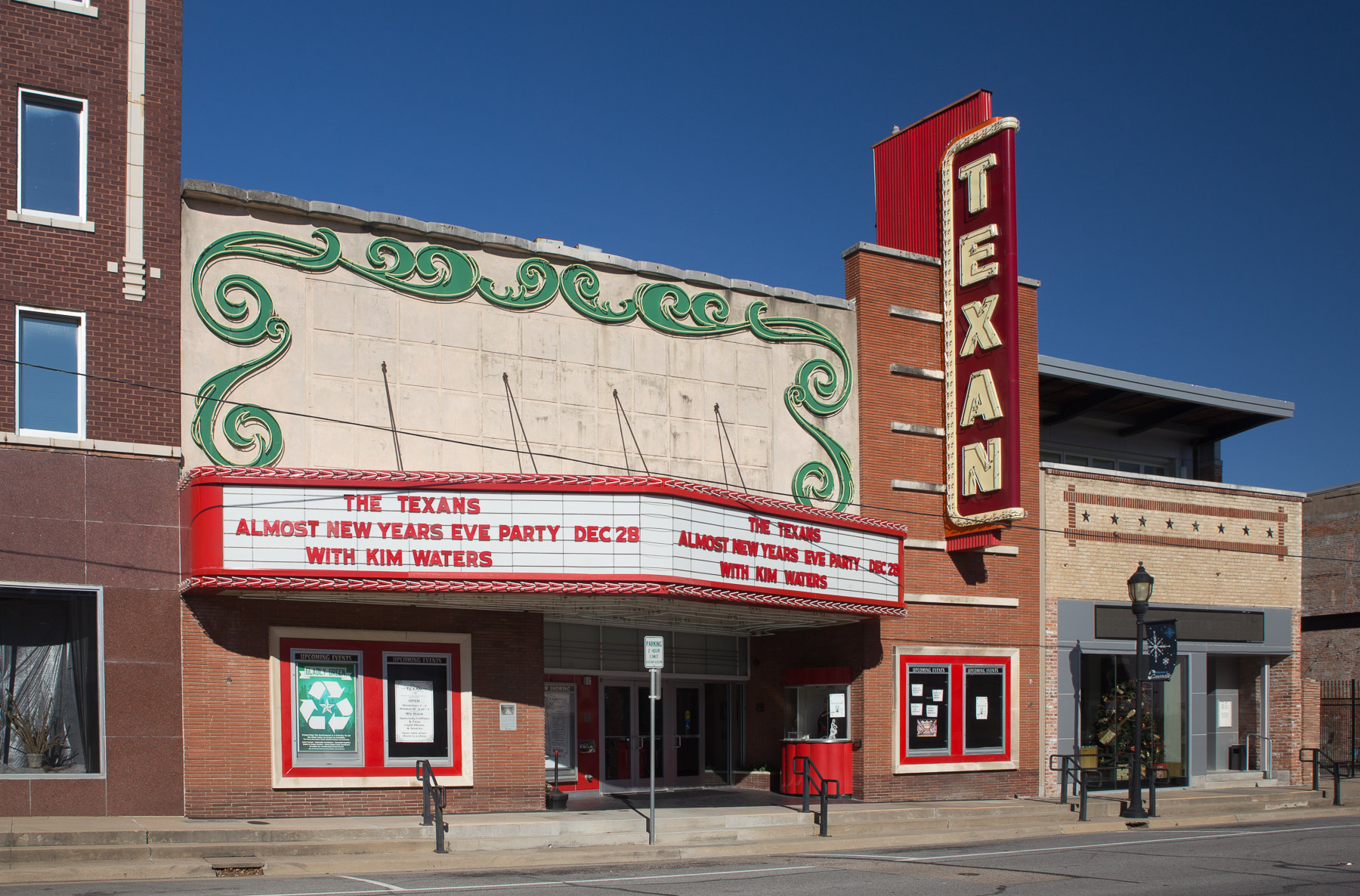
The Texan

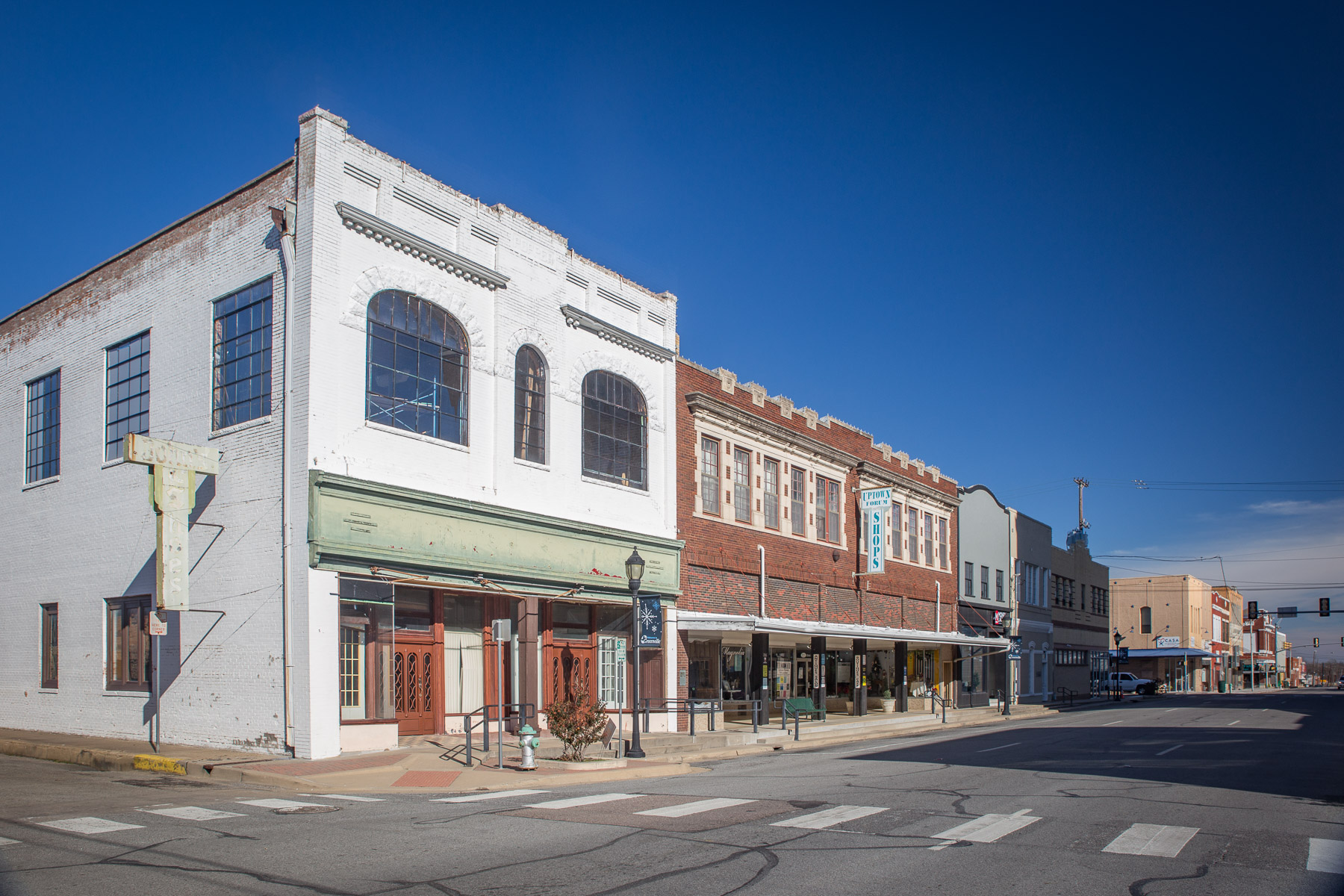
Downtown Greenville

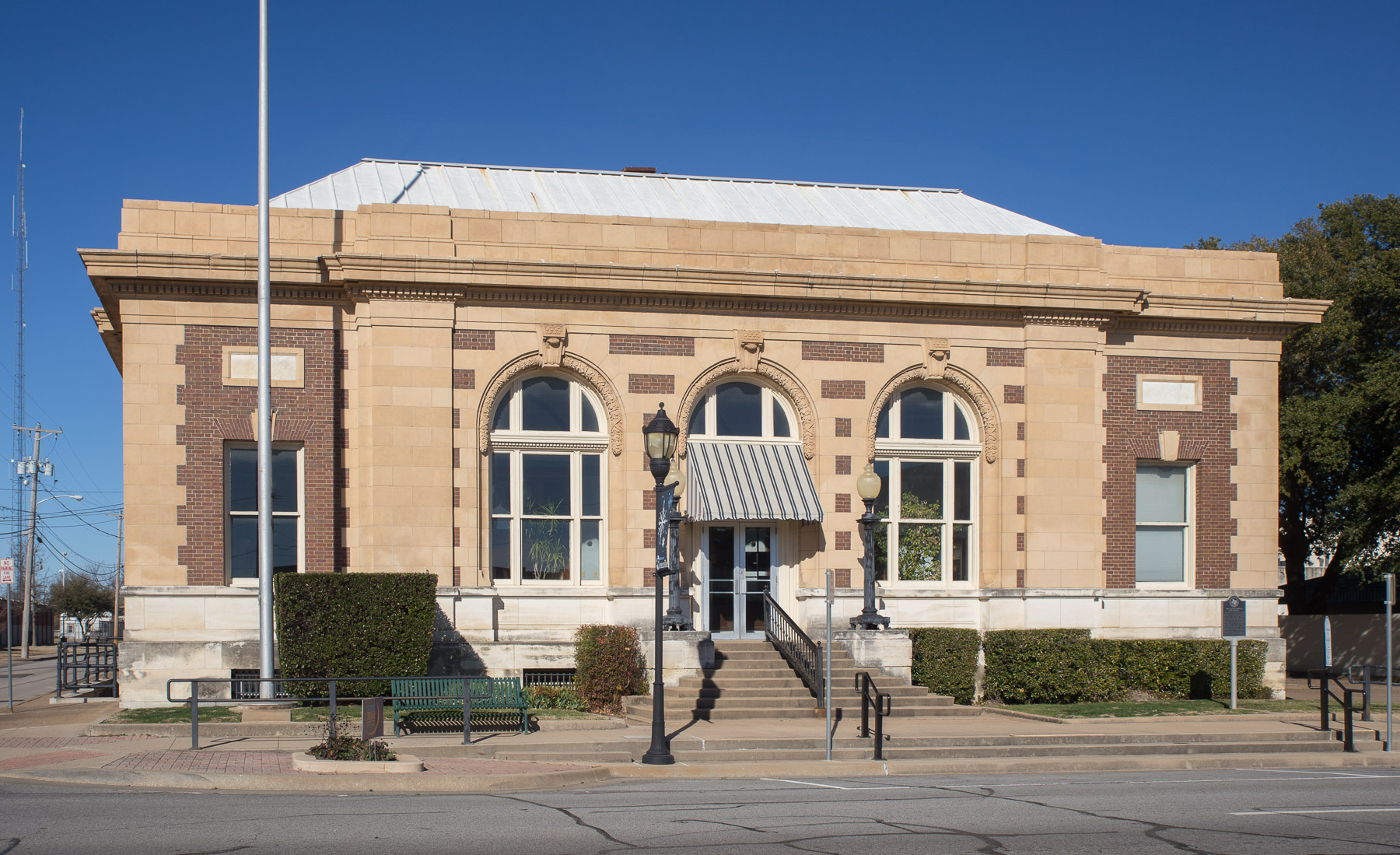
United States Post Office

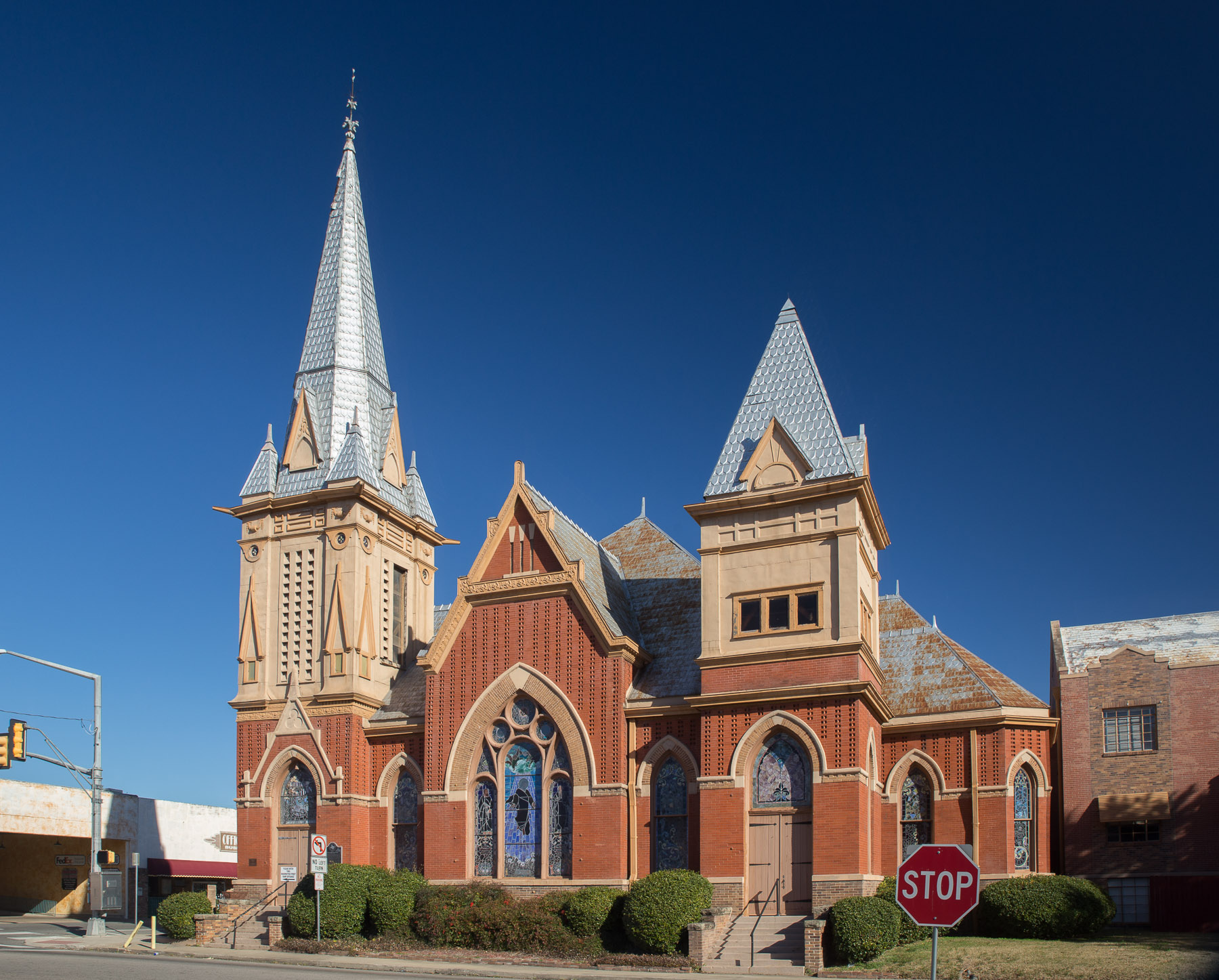
Central Christian Church

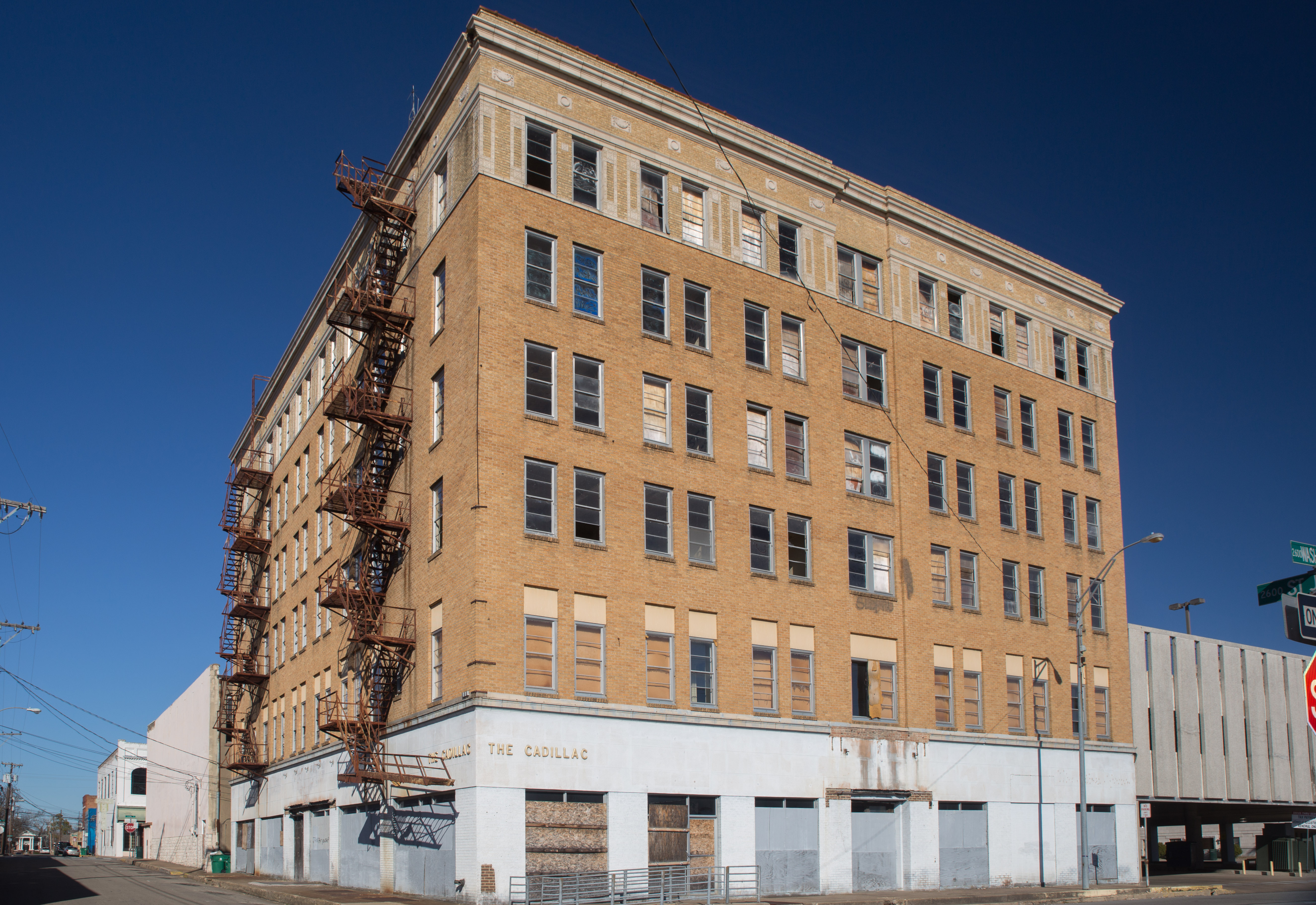
Washington Hotel

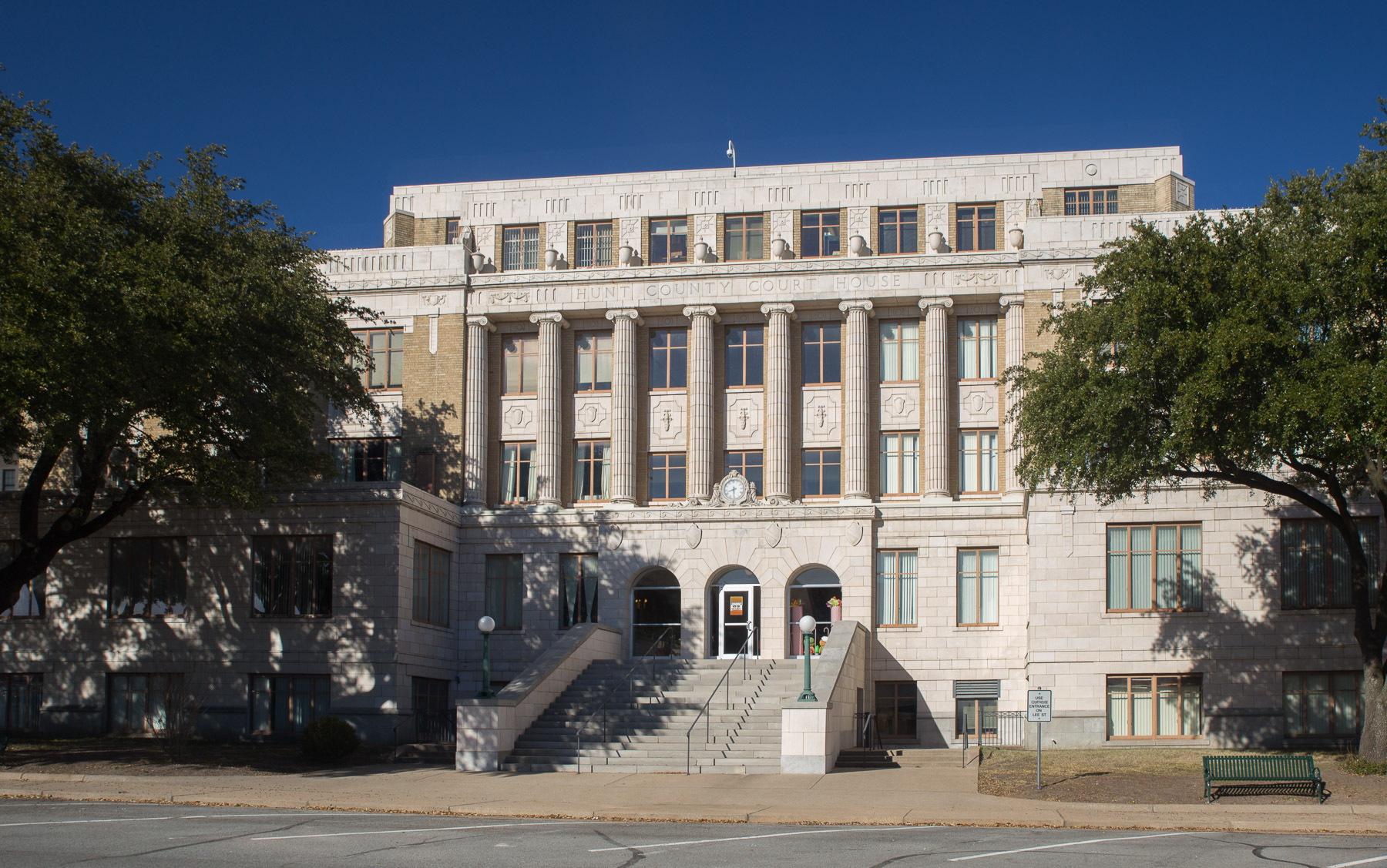
Hunt County Courthouse

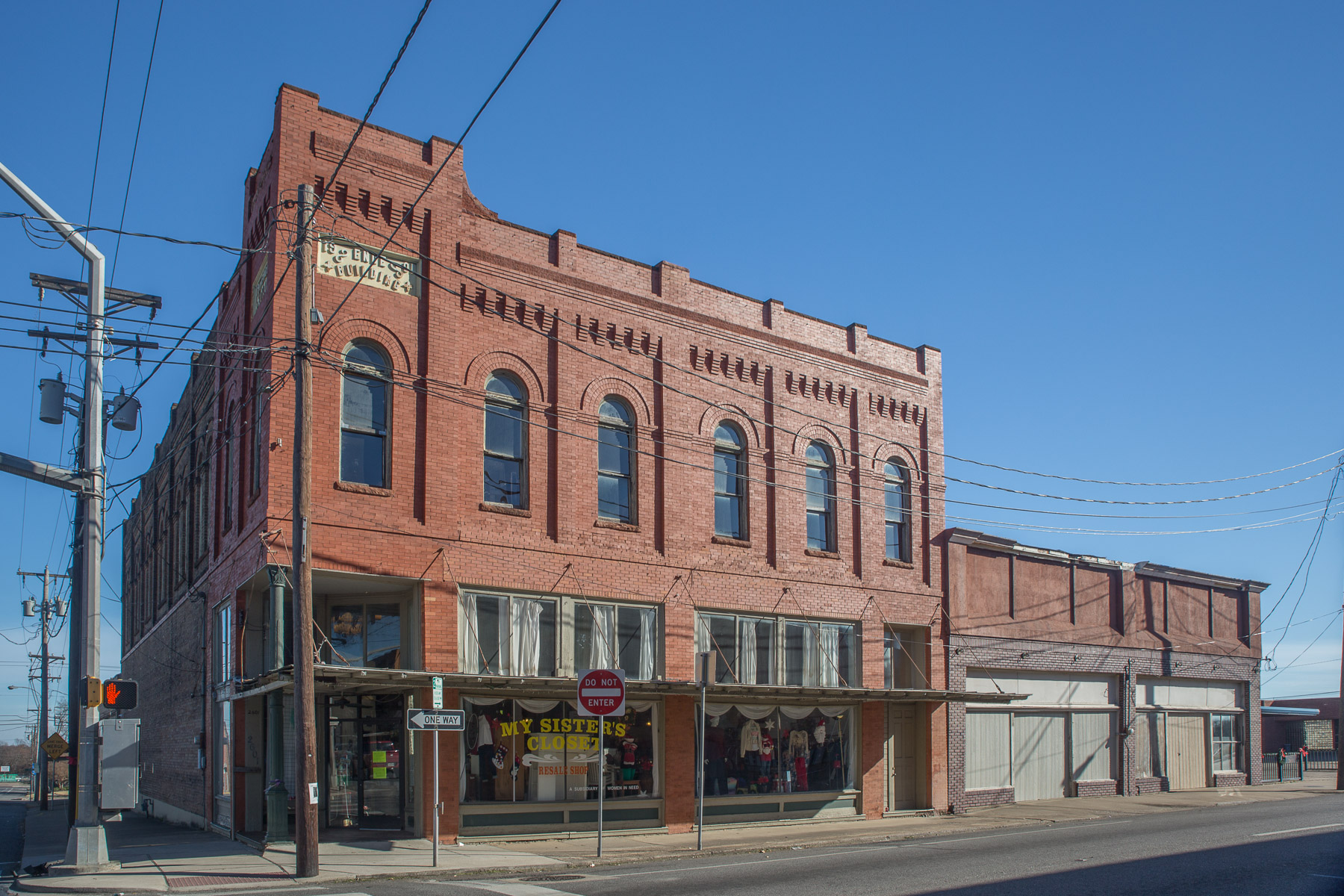
Ende Building

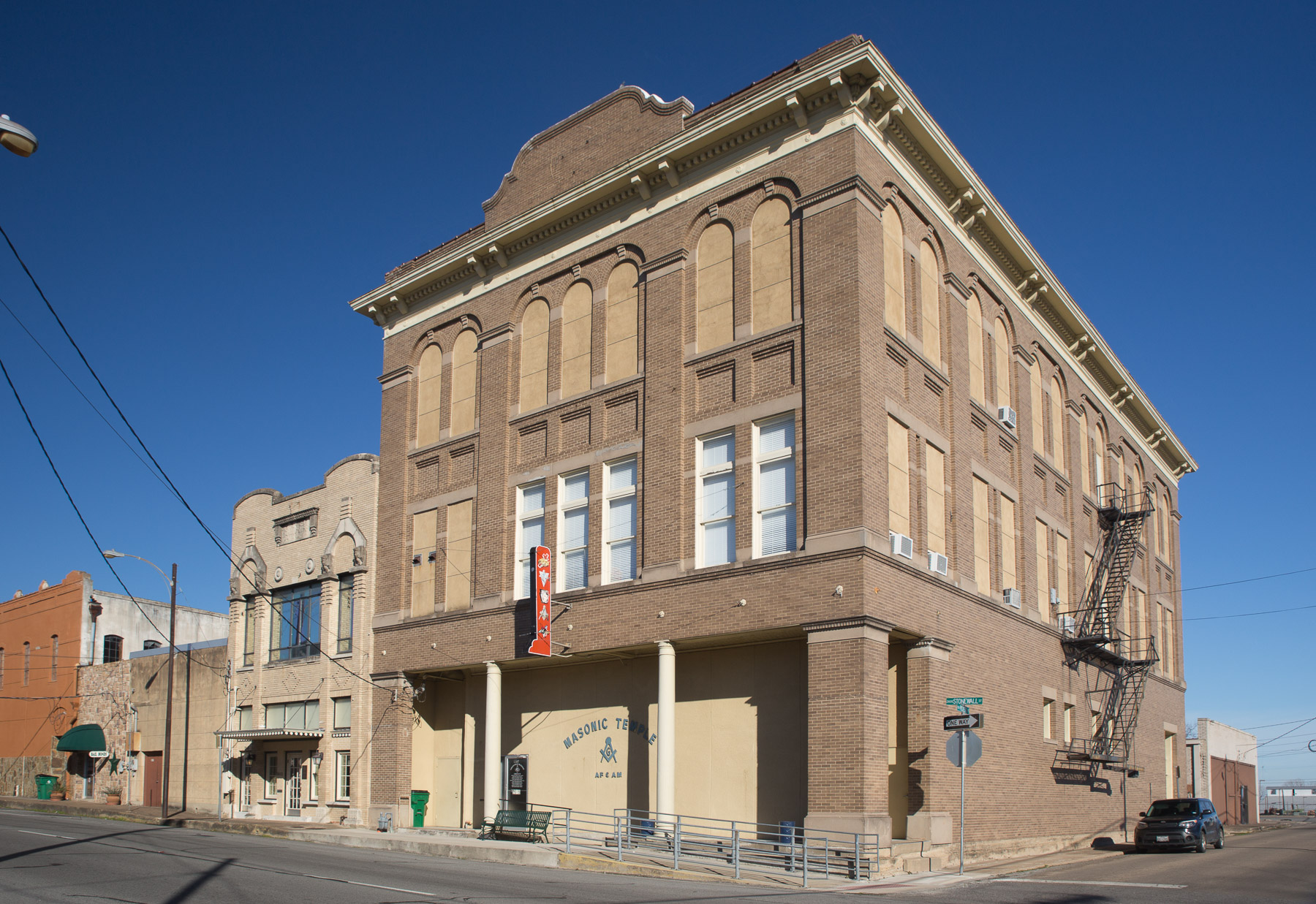
Masonic Lodge
