= 1974 NAIA Division I football season =

American college football season

- Regular season: August–November 1974
- Postseason: November 30– December 14, 1974
- National Championship: Javelina Stadium; Kingsville, TX
- Champions: Texas A&I (3)

The 1974 NAIA Division I football season was the 19th season of college football sponsored by the NAIA and the fifth season of the league's two-division structure.

The season was played from August to November 1974 and culminated in the 1974 NAIA Division I Champion Bowl, played on December 14, 1974, on the campus of Texas A&I University in Kingsville, Texas. Texas A&I defeated Elon in the Champion Bowl, 34–23, to win their third NAIA national title.

== Conference realignment ==
=== Conferences changes ===
- This was the first season for the Oklahoma Intercollegiate Conference. The second conference to bear this name, it was formed by six former members of the Oklahoma Collegiate Conference, which disbanded after the prior season. All six initial members were public colleges from Oklahoma.
- This was the final season of football for the Carolinas Conference. Before the start of the following season, the league's five members would subsequently join the new, football-only South Atlantic Conference.

=== Membership changes ===
Team	1973 conference	1974 conference
Central State	Oklahoma Collegiate	Oklahoma Intercollegiate
East Central Oklahoma State	Oklahoma Collegiate	Oklahoma Intercollegiate
Northeastern Oklahoma State	Oklahoma Collegiate	Oklahoma Intercollegiate
Northwestern Oklahoma State	Oklahoma Collegiate	Oklahoma Intercollegiate
Southeastern Oklahoma State	Oklahoma Collegiate	Oklahoma Intercollegiate
Southwestern Oklahoma State	Oklahoma Collegiate	Oklahoma Intercollegiate

== Conference standings ==
1974 Arkansas Intercollegiate Conference football standings
	Conf.					Overall
Team	W		L		T	W		L		T
No. 2 Henderson State $^	6	–	0	–	0	11	–	2	–	0
No. 13 Ouachita Baptist	4	–	1	–	1	7	–	2	–	1
Harding	3	–	2	–	1	5	–	4	–	1
Southern Arkansas	3	–	3	–	0	7	–	4	–	0
State College of Arkansas	2	–	2	–	2	6	–	3	–	2
Arkansas–Monticello	1	–	5	–	0	3	–	7	–	0
Arkansas Tech	0	–	6	–	0	1	–	9	–	0
$ – Conference champion; ^ – NAIA Division I playoff participant; Rankings from NAIA Division I poll

1974 Carolinas Conference football standings
	Conf.					Overall
Team	W		L		T	W		L		T
No. 4/15 Elon $^	4	–	0	–	0	10	–	2	–	0
Lenoir Rhyne	2	–	1	–	0	7	–	3	–	1
Catawba	1	–	2	–	1	5	–	4	–	1
Mars Hill	1	–	3	–	0	7	–	4	–	0
Guilford	0	–	2	–	1	7	–	3	–	1
$ – Conference champion; ^ – NAIA Division I playoff participant; Rankings from NAIA Division I poll and AP small college poll

1974 Evergreen Conference football standings
	Conf.					Overall
Team	W		L		T	W		L		T
Eastern Washington $	4	–	2	–	0	4	–	5	–	0
Oregon College	3	–	2	–	1	3	–	4	–	1
Central Washington	3	–	2	–	1	3	–	5	–	1
Eastern Oregon	3	–	3	–	0	5	–	4	–	0
Southern Oregon	3	–	3	–	0	5	–	4	–	0
Oregon Tech	2	–	2	–	2	3	–	3	–	2
Western Washington	1	–	5	–	0	1	–	7	–	1
$ – Conference champion

1974 Great Plains Athletic Conference football standings
	Conf.					Overall
Team	W		L		T	W		L		T
Northern Colorado $	5	–	0	–	0	8	–	1	–	0
Pittsburg State	4	–	1	–	0	4	–	7	–	0
Washburn	3	–	2	–	0	8	–	3	–	0
Southern Colorado	1	–	4	–	0	3	–	6	–	0
Emporia State	1	–	4	–	0	2	–	7	–	0
Fort Hays State	1	–	4	–	0	1	–	9	–	0
Kearney State *	0	–	0	–	0	7	–	2	–	0
$ – Conference champion; * – ineligible for conference standings

1974 Gulf South Conference football standings
	Conf.					Overall
Team	W		L		T	W		L		T
No. 7 Jacksonville State $	7	–	1	–	0	7	–	4	–	0
Delta State	7	–	2	–	0	8	–	3	–	0
No. 8 Livingston	5	–	3	–	0	8	–	3	–	0
Southeastern Louisiana	5	–	3	–	0	6	–	4	–	0
Troy State	4	–	4	–	0	6	–	4	–	0
North Alabama	4	–	4	–	0	4	–	6	–	0
Nicholls State	4	–	5	–	0	5	–	6	–	0
Northwestern State	1	–	6	–	0	1	–	10	–	0
Tennessee–Martin	1	–	7	–	0	2	–	9	–	0
Mississippi College	0	–	7	–	0	2	–	9	–	0
$ – Conference champion; Rankings from NAIA Division I poll

1974 Lone Star Conference football standings
	Conf.					Overall
Team	W		L		T	W		L		T
No. 1/3 Texas A&I $^	9	–	0	–	0	13	–	0	–	0
No. 5 Stephen F. Austin	7	–	2	–	0	9	–	2	–	0
Abilene Christian	6	–	3	–	0	7	–	4	–	0
Southwest Texas State	6	–	3	–	0	6	–	4	–	0
East Texas State	5	–	4	–	0	7	–	4	–	0
Howard Payne	4	–	5	–	0	5	–	6	–	0
Sam Houston State	4	–	5	–	0	4	–	7	–	0
Angelo State	3	–	4	–	0	4	–	6	–	0
Sul Ross	1	–	8	–	0	1	–	9	–	0
Tarleton State	0	–	9	–	0	1	–	10	–	0
$ – Conference champion; ^ – NAIA Division I playoff participant; Rankings from NAIA Division I poll and AP small college poll

1974 Mid-Eastern Athletic Conference football standings
	Conf.					Overall
Team	W		L		T	W		L		T
No. 11 South Carolina State $	5	–	1	–	0	8	–	4	–	0
Howard	4	–	1	–	1	8	–	2	–	1
North Carolina Central	4	–	1	–	1	7	–	2	–	2
Morgan State	4	–	2	–	0	5	–	5	–	0
North Carolina A&T	2	–	4	–	0	5	–	6	–	0
Maryland Eastern Shore	1	–	5	–	0	2	–	6	–	0
Delaware State	0	–	6	–	0	3	–	6	–	0
$ – Conference champion; Rankings from NAIA Division I poll

1974 Minnesota Intercollegiate Athletic Conference football standings
	Conf.					Overall
Team	W		L		T	W		L		T
Concordia–Moorhead +	5	–	2	–	0	7	–	2	–	0
No. 20 Saint John's (MN) +	5	–	2	–	0	7	–	2	–	0
Minnesota–Duluth	4	–	2	–	1	7	–	2	–	1
Hamline	4	–	2	–	1	4	–	5	–	1
St. Thomas (MN)	4	–	3	–	0	5	–	4	–	0
Gustavus Adolphus	4	–	3	–	0	4	–	6	–	0
Augsburg	3	–	4	–	0	5	–	5	–	0
St. Olaf	1	–	6	–	0	3	–	6	–	0
Macalester	1	–	6	–	0	2	–	8	–	0
+ – Conference co-champions; Macalester's win over Gustavus Adolphus counted in the conference standings for Macalester, but not for Gustavus Adolphus.; Rankings from NAIA Division I poll

1974 Nebraska College Conference football standings
	Conf.					Overall
Team	W		L		T	W		L		T
Kearney State $	3	–	0	–	0	7	–	2	–	0
Chadron State	2	–	1	–	0	6	–	3	–	0
Wayne State (NE)	1	–	2	–	0	4	–	6	–	0
Peru State	0	–	3	–	0	4	–	6	–	0
$ – Conference champion

1974 Northern Intercollegiate Conference football standings
	Conf.					Overall
Team	W		L		T	W		L		T
Michigan Tech $	6	–	0	–	0	9	–	0	–	0
St. Cloud State	5	–	1	–	0	5	–	5	–	0
Winona State	3	–	3	–	0	5	–	4	–	0
Moorhead State	3	–	3	–	0	4	–	5	–	0
Southwest State (MN)	2	–	4	–	0	4	–	5	–	0
Minnesota Morris	2	–	4	–	0	3	–	7	–	0
Bemidji State	0	–	6	–	0	2	–	7	–	0
$ – Conference champion

1974 Oklahoma Intercollegiate Conference football standings
	Conf.					Overall
Team	W		L		T	W		L		T
No. 14 SW Oklahoma State $	4	–	1	–	0	6	–	3	–	0
SE Oklahoma State	3	–	2	–	0	5	–	5	–	0
NW Oklahoma State	2	–	2	–	0	7	–	3	–	0
Central State (OK)	2	–	3	–	0	5	–	5	–	0
East Central	2	–	3	–	0	4	–	7	–	0
Northeastern State	1	–	3	–	0	4	–	5	–	0
$ – Conference champion; Rankings from NAIA Division I poll

1974 Pennsylvania State Athletic Conference football standings
	Conf.					Overall
Team	W		L		T	W		L		T
East Division
West Chester xy	5	–	0	–	0	8	–	2	–	0
No. 6 Millersville	5	–	1	–	0	8	–	1	–	0
East Stroudsburg	4	–	2	–	0	5	–	5	–	0
Kutztown	3	–	3	–	0	4	–	5	–	0
Cheyney	2	–	4	–	0	5	–	4	–	0
Mansfield	0	–	4	–	1	1	–	7	–	1
Bloomsburg	0	–	5	–	1	1	–	7	–	1
West Division
No. 13 Slippery Rock xy$^	5	–	0	–	1	9	–	1	–	1
Clarion	4	–	1	–	1	6	–	2	–	1
Indiana (PA)	4	–	2	–	0	6	–	4	–	0
Shippensburg	3	–	3	–	0	6	–	4	–	0
Edinboro	2	–	2	–	2	5	–	2	–	2
California (PA)	1	–	5	–	0	1	–	7	–	0
Lock Haven	0	–	6	–	0	1	–	8	–	0
Championship: Slippery Rock 20, West Chester 7
$ – Conference champion; x – Division champion/co-champions; y – Championship game participant; ^ – NCAA Division III playoff participant; Rankings from AP small college poll for Slippery Rock and NAIA Division I poll for Millersville

1974 Rocky Mountain Athletic Conference football standings
	Conf.					Overall
Team	W		L		T	W		L		T
Western State (CO) $	5	–	1	–	0	6	–	3	–	0
Westminster (UT)	3	–	3	–	0	6	–	3	–	0
Adams State	3	–	3	–	0	5	–	4	–	0
Fort Lewis	3	–	3	–	0	4	–	5	–	0
Southern Utah	3	–	3	–	0	3	–	6	–	0
Western New Mexico	2	–	4	–	0	4	–	5	–	0
Colorado Mines	2	–	4	–	0	3	–	6	–	0
New Mexico Highlands *	0	–	0	–	0	4	–	5	–	0
$ – Conference champion; * – ineligible for conference standings

1974 Southwestern Athletic Conference football standings
	Conf.					Overall
Team	W		L		T	W		L		T
No. 7 Grambling State +	5	–	1	–	0	11	–	1	–	0
No. 14 Alcorn State +^	5	–	1	–	0	9	–	2	–	0
No. 10 Jackson State	4	–	2	–	0	7	–	3	–	0
No. 12 Southern	3	–	3	–	0	8	–	3	–	0
Texas Southern	3	–	3	–	0	6	–	4	–	0
Mississippi Valley State	1	–	5	–	0	5	–	5	–	0
Prairie View A&M	0	–	6	–	0	0	–	10	–	0
+ – Conference co-champions; ^ – NCAA Division II playoff participant; Rankings from AP small college poll for Grambling State and Alconrn State and NAIA Division I poll for Jackson State and Southern

1974 West Virginia Intercollegiate Athletic Conference football standings
	Conf.					Overall
Team	W		L		T	W		L		T
Northern Division
Fairmont State xy$	4	–	0	–	0	7	–	4	–	0
No. 15 Salem	3	–	1	–	0	7	–	2	–	0
West Liberty State	2	–	2	–	0	5	–	4	–	0
Shepherd	1	–	2	–	0	2	–	9	–	0
West Virginia Wesleyan	0	–	4	–	0	1	–	8	–	0
Southern Division
Concord xy	3	–	1	–	0	6	–	5	–	0
Bluefield State	3	–	1	–	0	5	–	4	–	0
Glenville State	3	–	1	–	0	5	–	4	–	0
West Virginia Tech	1	–	3	–	0	5	–	4	–	0
West Virginia State	0	–	4	–	0	1	–	8	–	0
Championship: Fairmont State 30, Concord 6
$ – Conference champion; x – Division champion/co-champions; y – Championship game participant; Conference standings based on power ratings; Rankings from NAIA Division I poll

1974 Wisconsin State University Conference football standings
	Conf.					Overall
Team	W		L		T	W		L		T
No. 17 Wisconsin–Platteville +	7	–	1	–	0	8	–	2	–	0
No. 18 Wisconsin–Whitewater +	7	–	1	–	0	8	–	3	–	0
No. 16 Wisconsin–La Crosse +	7	–	1	–	0	7	–	3	–	0
Wisconsin–River Falls	5	–	3	–	0	7	–	3	–	0
Wisconsin–Eau Claire	4	–	4	–	0	6	–	4	–	0
Wisconsin–Oshkosh	2	–	6	–	0	3	–	7	–	0
Wisconsin–Stevens Point	2	–	6	–	0	3	–	7	–	0
Wisconsin–Stout	1	–	7	–	0	2	–	8	–	0
Wisconsin–Superior	1	–	7	–	0	1	–	9	–	0
+ – Conference co-champions; Wisconsin–La Crosse forfeited one non-conference game.; Rankings from NAIA Division I poll

1974 NAIA Division I independents football records
	Conf.			Overall
Team	W	L	T	W		L		T
No. 3 Cameron ^		–		9	–	3	–	0
No. 19 Eastern New Mexico		–		7	–	4	–	0
Wofford		–		7	–	4	–	0
Kentucky State		–		6	–	4	–	0
Presbyterian		–		6	–	5	–	0
New Mexico Highlands		–		4	–	5	–	0
Langston		–		1	–	9	–	0
^ – NAIA Division I playoff participant; Rankings from NAIA Division I poll

== Postseason ==
Semifinals; November 30–December 7, 1974
Henderson State	7
Elon*	21
Cameron	18
Texas A&I*	21

1974 NAIA Champion Bowl; December 7, 1974; Kingsville, TX
Elon	23
Texas A&I*	34

== See also ==
- 1974 NAIA Division II football season
- 1974 NCAA Division I football season
- 1974 NCAA Division II football season
- 1974 NCAA Division III football season
