= Tammariello =

Tammariello is a surname. Notable people with the surname include:

- Augie Tammariello (fl. 1957–1987), American college football coach
- Frank Tammariello (fl. late 20th century), American filmmaker and television commercial director
