= 1974 Florida A&M Rattlers football team =

American college football season

1974 Florida A&M Rattlers football

Orange Blossom Classic, W 17–13 vs. Howard
- Conference: Southern Intercollegiate Athletic Conference
- Division I
- Record: 6–5 (3–2 SIAC)
- Head coach: Rudy Hubbard (1st season)
- Home stadium: Bragg Memorial Stadium; Doak Campbell Stadium

1974 Southern Intercollegiate Athletic Conference football standings
	Conf.					Overall
Team	W		L		T	W		L		T
Division I
Tuskegee x	5	–	0	–	0	10	–	1	–	0
Bethune–Cookman	4	–	1	–	0	8	–	3	–	1
Florida A&M	3	–	2	–	0	6	–	5	–	0
Alabama State	2	–	3	–	0	2	–	8	–	0
Alabama A&M	1	–	4	–	0	4	–	7	–	0
Albany State	1	–	4	–	0	3	–	7	–	0
Morris Brown	1	–	4	–	0	2	–	8	–	0
Division II
Clark (GA) x	5	–	0	–	0	8	–	1	–	0
Fisk	4	–	1	–	0	5	–	4	–	0
Fort Valley State	3	–	2	–	0	5	–	3	–	0
Savannah State	3	–	2	–	0	3	–	6	–	1
Knoxville	2	–	3	–	0	7	–	4	–	0
Miles	2	–	3	–	0	3	–	6	–	0
Morehouse	1	–	4	–	0	2	–	7	–	0
Lane	0	–	5	–	0	0	–	8	–	0
x – Division champion/co-champions

The 1974 Florida A&M Rattlers football team represented Florida A&M University as a member of Division I of the Southern Intercollegiate Athletic Conference (SIAC) during the 1974 NCAA Division II football season. Led by first-year head coach Rudy Hubbard, the Rattlers finished the season overall record of 6–5 and a mark of 3–2 in conference play, and finished third in the SIAC's Division I.

== Schedule ==
Date	Opponent	Site	Result	Attendance	Source
September 21	vs. Albany State	Moultrie, GA	W 28–13	12,106	
September 28	North Carolina A&T*	Bragg Memorial Stadium; Tallahassee, FL	W 28–19	13,086	
October 12	vs. Alabama State	Ernest F. Ladd Memorial Stadium; Mobile, AL	W 23–12	8,223	
October 19	at Morris Brown	Herndon Stadium; Atlanta, GA	W 29–3	10,700	
October 26	No. 13 Tennessee State*	Doak Campbell Stadium; Tallahassee, FL	L 14–17	25,000	
November 2	Tuskegee^{†}	Bragg Memorial Stadium; Tallahassee, FL	L 6–32	14,500	
November 9	Alabama A&M	Bragg Memorial Stadium; Tallahassee, FL	W 37–12	8,000	
November 16	at Southern*	University Stadium; Baton Rouge, LA	L 8–24	14,500–16,000	
November 23	at Bethune–Cookman	Daytona International Speedway; Daytona Beach, FL (Florida Classic)	L 0–6	22,300	
November 30	at Tampa*	Tampa Stadium; Tampa, FL	L 10–35	24,541	
December 7	vs. Howard*	Miami Orange Bowl; Miami, FL (Orange Blossom Classic)	W 17–13	21,167	
*Non-conference game; ^{†}Homecoming; Rankings from AP Poll released prior to the game; Source:
