= 1974 college football season =

1974 college football season may refer to:

- 1974 NCAA Division I football season
- 1974 NCAA Division II football season
- 1974 NCAA Division III football season
- 1974 NAIA Division I football season
- 1974 NAIA Division II football season
