= 1974 Western Michigan Broncos football team =

American college football season

1974 Western Michigan Broncos football
- Conference: Mid-American Conference
- Record: 3–8 (0–5 MAC)
- Head coach: Bill Doolittle (11th season)
- MVP: Dan Matthews
- Captains: Greg Crowser; Paul Jorgensen
- Home stadium: Waldo Stadium

1974 Mid-American Conference football standings
	Conf.					Overall
Team	W		L		T	W		L		T
No. 10 Miami (OH) $	5	–	0	–	0	10	–	0	–	1
Ohio	3	–	2	–	0	6	–	5	–	0
Toledo	3	–	2	–	0	6	–	5	–	0
Kent State	2	–	3	–	0	7	–	4	–	0
Bowling Green	2	–	3	–	0	6	–	4	–	1
Western Michigan	0	–	5	–	0	3	–	8	–	0
$ – Conference champion; Rankings from AP Poll

The 1974 Western Michigan Broncos football team represented Western Michigan University in the Mid-American Conference (MAC) during the 1974 NCAA Division I football season. In their 11th season under head coach Bill Doolittle, the Broncos compiled a 3–8 record (0–5 against MAC opponents), finished in sixth place in the MAC, and were outscored by their opponents, 269 to 187. The team played its home games at Waldo Stadium in Kalamazoo, Michigan.

The team's statistical leaders included Paul Jorgensen with 701 passing yards, Dan Matthews with 769 rushing yards, and Greg Cowser with 403 receiving yards. Tight end Greg Crowser and quarterback Paul Jorgensen were the team captains. Halfback Dan Matthews received the team's most outstanding player award.

On November 18, 1974, after "mounting pressure" for a change in the school's football coach, Doolittle resigned. In 11 years as head coach, Doolittle compiled a 58–49–2 record at Western Michigan.

== Schedule ==
Date	Opponent	Site	Result	Attendance	Source
September 7	UT Arlington*	Waldo Stadium; Kalamazoo, MI	W 33–6	17,800	
September 14	at Eastern Michigan*	Rynearson Stadium; Ypsilanti, MI	L 20–28	9,600	
September 21	at Northern Illinois*	Huskie Stadium; DeKalb, IL	W 30–13		
September 28	Bowling Green	Waldo Stadium; Kalamazoo, MI	L 13–21		
October 5	at Kent State	Dix Stadium; Kent, OH	L 6–28	11,357	
October 12	Toledo	Waldo Stadium; Kalamazoo, MI	L 24–31	23,750	
October 19	at Marshall*	Fairfield Stadium; Huntington, WV	W 20–17		
October 26	Ohio	Waldo Stadium; Kalamazoo, MI	L 3–26	16,500	
November 2	at Miami (OH)	Miami Field; Oxford, OH	L 0–31		
November 9	No. 8 Central Michigan*	Waldo Stadium; Kalamazoo, MI (rivalry)	L 6–42	24,235–24,250	
November 16	at Long Beach State*	Veterans Memorial Stadium; Long Beach, CA	L 33–34	5,026	
*Non-conference game; Rankings from AP Poll released prior to the game

== See also ==
- 1974 in Michigan
