= Davis Weathersby =

American football player and coach

Biographical details
- Born: c. 1932
- Education: Alcorn Agricultural and Mechanical College; Indiana University Bloomington

Playing career
- 1952–1954: Alcorn A&M
- Position: Guard

Coaching career (HC unless noted)
- 1955: Coleman HS (MS) (line)
- 1956–1969: Coleman HS (MS)
- 1970–1977: Mississippi Valley State

Administrative career (AD unless noted)
- 1972–1982: Mississippi Valley State

Head coaching record
- Overall: 33–45 (college)

Davis Weathersby (born c. 1932) is an American former football coach and college athletics administrator. He was the eighth head football coach at Mississippi Valley State University in Itta Bena, Mississippi, serving for eight seasons, from 1970 to 1977, and compiling a record of 33–45. Weathersby attended Alcorn Agricultural and Mechanical College—now known as Alcorn State University—lettering in football from 1952 to 1954. He played as a guard and was team captain in 1954. Weathersby also lettered in track and field for Alcorn State.

In 1964, he received a masters degree from Indiana University Bloomington.

== Head coaching record ==
=== College ===
| Year | Team | Overall | Conference | Standing | Bowl/playoffs |
|---|---|---|---|---|---|
Mississippi Valley State Delta Devils (Southwestern Athletic Conference) (1970–1977)
| 1970 | Mississippi Valley State | 1–8 | 0–6 | 7th | |
| 1971 | Mississippi Valley State | 4–7 | 1–5 | T–6th | |
| 1972 | Mississippi Valley State | 5–5 | 1–5 | T–5th | |
| 1973 | Mississippi Valley State | 3–5 | 2–4 | 6th | |
| 1974 | Mississippi Valley State | 5–5 | 1–5 | 6th | |
| 1975 | Mississippi Valley State | 6–4 | 3–3 | T–4th | |
| 1976 | Mississippi Valley State | 4–6 | 1–5 | T–6th | |
| 1977 | Mississippi Valley State | 5–5 | 2–4 | T–4th | |
| Mississippi Valley State: | | 33–45 | 11–37 | | |
| Total: | | 33–45 | | | |
