= 1974 Jackson State Tigers football team =

American college football season

1974 Jackson State Tigers football
- Conference: Southwestern Athletic Conference
- Record: 7–3 (4–2 SWAC)
- Head coach: Robert Hill (4th season)
- Home stadium: Mississippi Veterans Memorial Stadium

1974 Southwestern Athletic Conference football standings
	Conf.					Overall
Team	W		L		T	W		L		T
No. 7 Grambling State +	5	–	1	–	0	11	–	1	–	0
No. 14 Alcorn State +^	5	–	1	–	0	9	–	2	–	0
No. 10 Jackson State	4	–	2	–	0	7	–	3	–	0
No. 12 Southern	3	–	3	–	0	8	–	3	–	0
Texas Southern	3	–	3	–	0	6	–	4	–	0
Mississippi Valley State	1	–	5	–	0	5	–	5	–	0
Prairie View A&M	0	–	6	–	0	0	–	10	–	0
+ – Conference co-champions; ^ – NCAA Division II playoff participant; Rankings from AP small college poll for Grambling State and Alconrn State and NAIA Division I poll for Jackson State and Southern

The 1974 Jackson State Tigers football team represented the Jackson State University as a member of the Southwestern Athletic Conference (SWAC) during the 1974 NCAA Division II football season. Led by fourth-year head coach Robert Hill, The Tigers compiled an overall record of 7–3 with a conference mark of 4–2, placing third in the SWAC. Jackson State played their home games at Mississippi Veterans Memorial Stadium in Jackson, Mississippi.

== Schedule ==
Date	Opponent	Site	Result	Attendance	Source
September 7	vs. Morgan State*	Veterans Stadium; Philadelphia, PA (OIC Classic)	L 6–10	20,500	
September 21	Prairie View A&M	Mississippi Veterans Memorial Stadium; Jackson, MS	W 67–7	18,000	
September 28	Mississippi Valley State	Mississippi Veterans Memorial Stadium; Jackson, MS	W 25–6	21,000	
October 5	Nebraska–Omaha*	Mississippi Veterans Memorial Stadium; Jackson, MS	W 75–0	18,000	
October 12	at Bishop*	Dallas, TX	W 36–10	10,000	
October 19	at Southern	A. W. Mumford Stadium; Baton Rouge, LA (rivalry)	L 19–21	21,000	
October 26	at No. 6 Grambling State	Grambling Stadium; Grambling, LA	L 13–26	16,000–18,727	
November 2	vs. Bethune–Cookman*	Tampa Stadium; Tampa, FL	W 23–7	8,000	
November 9	Texas Southern	Mississippi Veterans Memorial Stadium; Jackson, MS	W 34–28	20,000	
November 23	at No. 8 Alcorn State	Henderson Stadium; Lorman, MS (rivalry)	W 19–13	18,000–24,000	
*Non-conference game; Rankings from AP Poll released prior to the game

== Roster ==
1974 Jackson State Tigers football team roster
Players
Coaches
Offense

Pos.	#	Name	Class
RB	34	Walter Payton	Sr
RB		Rickey Young	Sr

Defense

Pos.	#	Name	Class
LB	80	Robert Brazile	Sr
DT		Oakley Dalton	So
DB		Charles James	Sr
LB		John Tate	Sr

Special teams

Pos.	#	Name	Class

Head coach

- Robert Hill

Coordinators/assistant coaches

Legend

- (C) Team captain
- (S) Suspended
- (I) Ineligible
- Injured
- Redshirt

== Game summaries ==
=== At Grambling State ===
Team	1	2	3	4	Total
Tigers	0	0	7	6	13
• No. 6 Tigers	0	7	12	7	26

- Date: October 26
- Location: Grambling Stadium,
  Grambling, LA

Scoring summary
2	GSU	Scales 14-yard pass from Williams (Zeno kick)	GSU 7–0
3	GSU	Williams 1-yard run (kick failed)	GSU 13–0
3	JSU	Wadley 41-yard pass from Lewis (Perry kick)	GSU 13–7
3	GSU	Pennywell 22-yard pass from Williams (kick failed)	GSU 19–7
4	JSU	Payton 1-yard run (kick failed)	GSU 19–13
4	GSU	Martin 1-yard run (Zeno kick)	GSU 26–13

== 1975 NFL draft ==
Player	Position	Round	Pick	NFL club
Walter Payton	Running back	1	4	Chicago Bears
Robert Brazile	Linebacker	1	6	Houston Oilers
Rickey Young	Running back	7	164	San Diego Chargers
John Tate	Linebacker	8	183	New York Giants
Charles James	Defensive back	10	249	New York Jets
