= 1974 Southwest Texas State Bobcats football team =

American college football season

1974 Southwest Texas State Bobcats football
- Conference: Lone Star Conference
- Record: 6–4 (6–3 LSC)
- Head coach: Bill Miller (10th season)
- Home stadium: Evans Field

1974 Lone Star Conference football standings
	Conf.					Overall
Team	W		L		T	W		L		T
No. 1/3 Texas A&I $^	9	–	0	–	0	13	–	0	–	0
No. 5 Stephen F. Austin	7	–	2	–	0	9	–	2	–	0
Abilene Christian	6	–	3	–	0	7	–	4	–	0
Southwest Texas State	6	–	3	–	0	6	–	4	–	0
East Texas State	5	–	4	–	0	7	–	4	–	0
Howard Payne	4	–	5	–	0	5	–	6	–	0
Sam Houston State	4	–	5	–	0	4	–	7	–	0
Angelo State	3	–	4	–	0	4	–	6	–	0
Sul Ross	1	–	8	–	0	1	–	9	–	0
Tarleton State	0	–	9	–	0	1	–	10	–	0
$ – Conference champion; ^ – NAIA Division I playoff participant; Rankings from NAIA Division I poll and AP small college poll

The 1974 Southwest Texas State Bobcats football team was an American football team that represented Southwest Texas State University (now known as Texas State University) during the 1974 NAIA Division I football season as a member of the Lone Star Conference (LSC). In their tenth year under head coach Bill Miller, the team compiled an overall record of 6–4, with a mark of 6–3 in conference play.

== Schedule ==
Date	Opponent	Site	Result	Source
September 14	Texas Lutheran*	Evans Field; San Marcos, TX	L 7–30	
September 28	Angelo State	Evans Field; San Marcos, TX	W 17–14	
October 5	at Abilene Christian	Shotwell Stadium; Abilene, TX	L 9–42	
October 12	at Tarleton State	Stephenville, TX	W 35–0	
October 19	Stephen F. Austin	Evans Field; San Marcos, TX	L 7–12	
October 26	at Sam Houston State	Pritchett Field; Huntsville, TX (rivalry)	W 20–6	
November 2	at East Texas State	Memorial Stadium; Commerce, TX	W 20–14	
November 9	Howard Payne	Evans Field; San Marcos, TX	W 17–7	
November 14	at Sul Ross	Jackson Field; Alpine, TX	W 24–14	
November 23	Texas A&I	Evans Field; San Marcos, TX	L 0–14	
*Non-conference game
