= 1974 UT Arlington Mavericks football team =

American college football season

1974 UT Arlington Mavericks football
- Conference: Southland Conference
- Record: 1–10 (1–4 Southland)
- Head coach: Harold Elliott (1st season)
- Home stadium: Arlington Stadium

1974 Southland Conference football standings
	Conf.					Overall
Team	W		L		T	W		L		T
No. 2 Louisiana Tech $^	5	–	0	–	0	11	–	1	–	0
Lamar	4	–	1	–	0	8	–	2	–	0
Arkansas State	3	–	2	–	0	7	–	3	–	0
McNeese State	2	–	3	–	0	6	–	4	–	1
UT Arlington	1	–	4	–	0	1	–	10	–	0
SW Louisiana	0	–	5	–	0	2	–	9	–	0
$ – Conference champion; ^ – NCAA Division II playoff participant; Rankings from AP small college poll

The 1974 UT Arlington Mavericks football team was an American football team that represented the University of Texas at Arlington in the Southland Conference during the 1974 NCAA Division II football season. In their first year under head coach Harold Elliott, the team compiled a 1–10 record.

== Schedule ==
Date	Opponent	Site	Result	Attendance	Source
September 7	at Western Michigan*	Waldo Stadium; Kalamazoo, MI	L 6–33	17,800	
September 14	at TCU*	Amon G. Carter Stadium; Fort Worth, TX	L 3–12	17,210	
September 21	No. 2 Louisiana Tech	Cotton Bowl; Dallas, TX	L 15–42	4,419	
September 28	at New Mexico State*	Memorial Stadium; Las Cruces, NM	L 14–42	11,392	
October 12	at Southern Miss*	Mississippi Veterans Memorial Stadium; Jackson, MS	L 10–39	2,800	
October 19	at McNeese State	Cowboy Stadium; Lake Charles, LA	L 0–43	11,000	
October 26	UTEP*	Arlington Stadium; Arlington, TX	L 14–28	4,600	
November 2	at Pacific (CA)*	Pacific Memorial Stadium; Stockton, CA	L 17–26	8,500	
November 9	Southwestern Louisiana	Arlington Stadium; Arlington, TX	W 21–17	500	
November 16	Arkansas State	Arlington Stadium; Arlington, TX	L 12–42	1,000–1,750	
November 23	at Lamar	Cardinal Stadium; Beaumont, TX	L 0–8		
*Non-conference game; Rankings from AP Poll released prior to the game
