= Billy Tidwell =

American football player and coach (1930–1990)

No. 24
- Positions: Halfback, defensive back

Personal information
- Born: August 3, 1930; Hearne, Texas, U.S.
- Died: December 19, 1990 (aged 60); Trinity, Texas, U.S.
- Listed height: 5 ft 9 in (1.75 m)
- Listed weight: 178 lb (81 kg)

Career information
- College: Texas A&M
- NFL draft: 1952: 3rd round, 33rd overall pick

Career history

Playing
- San Francisco 49ers (1954)

Coaching
- Sam Houston State (1955-1973) Assistant; Sam Houston St. (1974-1977) Head coach

Operations
- Sam Houston St. (1974-1979)

Awards and highlights
- Second-team All-SWC (1950)

Career NFL statistics
- Rushing yards: 1
- Rushing average: 1
- Return yards: 287
- Stats at Pro Football Reference

Head coaching record
- Regular season: 11–30–1 (.274)

Billy Reyne Tidwell (August 3, 1930 – December 19, 1990) was an American professional football player and coach. Tidwell was drafted 33rd overall in the third round of the 1952 NFL draft by the San Francisco 49ers. He served as the head football coach at Sam Houston State University from 1974 to 1977, compiling a record of 11–30–1.

== Head coaching record ==
Year	Team	Overall	Conference	Standing	Bowl/playoffs
Sam Houston State Bearkats (Lone Star Conference) (1974–1977)
1974	Sam Houston State	4–7	4–5	T–6th	
1975	Sam Houston State	3–8	3–6	7th	
1976	Sam Houston State	3–5–1	2–5	6th	
1977	Sam Houston State	1–10	1–6	7th	
Sam Houston State:		11–30–1	10–22		
Total:		11–30–1			
