= 1974 Lamar Cardinals football team =

American college football season

1974 Lamar Cardinals football
- Conference: Southland Conference
- Record: 8–2 (4–1 Southland)
- Head coach: Vernon Glass (12th season)
- Home stadium: Cardinal Stadium

1974 Southland Conference football standings
	Conf.					Overall
Team	W		L		T	W		L		T
No. 2 Louisiana Tech $^	5	–	0	–	0	11	–	1	–	0
Lamar	4	–	1	–	0	8	–	2	–	0
Arkansas State	3	–	2	–	0	7	–	3	–	0
McNeese State	2	–	3	–	0	6	–	4	–	1
UT Arlington	1	–	4	–	0	1	–	10	–	0
SW Louisiana	0	–	5	–	0	2	–	9	–	0
$ – Conference champion; ^ – NCAA Division II playoff participant; Rankings from AP small college poll

The 1974 Lamar Cardinals football team represented Lamar University as a member of the Southland Conference during the 1974 NCAA Division II football season. Led by 12th-year head coach Vernon Glass, the Cardinals compiled an overall record of 8–2 with a mark of 4–1 in conference play, placing second in the Southland. Lamar played home games at Cardinal Stadium in Beaumont, Texas.

== Schedule ==
Date	Opponent	Site	Result	Attendance	Source
September 21	Drake*	Cardinal Stadium; Beaumont, TX	W 18–6	16,278	
September 28	at North Texas State*	Fouts Field; Denton, TX	W 27–7	11,200	
October 5	at Southwestern Louisiana	Cajun Field; Lafayette, LA (rivalry)	W 38–13	17,300	
October 12	Mississippi State*	Cardinal Stadium; Beaumont, TX	L 21–37	16,817	
October 19	at Arkansas State	Indian Stadium; Jonesboro, AR	W 10–6	7,687	
October 26	Southern Miss*	Cardinal Stadium; Beaumont, TX	W 10–7	14,106	
November 2	at West Texas State*	Kimbrough Memorial Stadium; Canyon, TX	W 9–7		
November 9	at No. 1 Louisiana Tech	Joe Aillet Stadium; Ruston, LA	L 0–28	16,231	
November 16	No. 10 McNeese State	Cardinal Stadium; Beaumont, TX (Battle of the Border)	W 17–3	11,700	
November 23	UT Arlington	Cardinal Stadium; Beaumont, TX	W 8–0		
*Non-conference game; Rankings from AP Poll released prior to the game
