= 1974 Arkansas State Indians football team =

American college football season

1974 Arkansas State Indians football
- Conference: Southland Conference
- Record: 7–3 (3–2 Southland)
- Head coach: Bill Davidson (4th season)
- Home stadium: Indian Stadium

1974 Southland Conference football standings
	Conf.					Overall
Team	W		L		T	W		L		T
No. 2 Louisiana Tech $^	5	–	0	–	0	11	–	1	–	0
Lamar	4	–	1	–	0	8	–	2	–	0
Arkansas State	3	–	2	–	0	7	–	3	–	0
McNeese State	2	–	3	–	0	6	–	4	–	1
UT Arlington	1	–	4	–	0	1	–	10	–	0
SW Louisiana	0	–	5	–	0	2	–	9	–	0
$ – Conference champion; ^ – NCAA Division II playoff participant; Rankings from AP small college poll

The 1974 Arkansas State Indians football team represented Arkansas State University as a member of the Southland Conference during the 1974 NCAA Division II football season. Led by fourth-year head coach Bill Davidson, the Indians compiled an overall record of 7–3 with a mark of 3–2 in conference, placing third in the Southland.

== Schedule ==
Date	Opponent	Site	Result	Attendance	Source
September 28	No. 1 Louisiana Tech	Indian Stadium; Jonesboro, AR	L 7–20	10,231	
October 5	Eastern Michigan*	Indian Stadium; Jonesboro, AR	W 14–7	8,422	
October 12	at Illinois State*	Hancock Stadium; Normal, IL	W 38–0	14,000	
October 19	Lamar	Indian Stadium; Jonesboro, AR	L 6–10	7,687	
October 26	at Southern Illinois*	McAndrew Stadium; Carbondale, IL	W 41–16	6,243	
November 2	Northeast Louisiana*^{†}	Indian Stadium; Jonesboro, AR	W 17–14	10,384	
November 9	at Bowling Green*	Doyt Perry Stadium; Bowling Green, OH	L 0–17	11,334	
November 16	at UT Arlington	Arlington Stadium; Arlington, TX	W 42–12	1,000–1,750	
November 23	McNeese State	Indian Stadium; Jonesboro, AR	W 22–20	5,881	
November 29	at Southwestern Louisiana	Cajun Field; Lafayette, LA	W 28–6	6,483–6,831	
*Non-conference game; ^{†}Homecoming; Rankings from AP Poll released prior to the game
