= 1974 Grambling State Tigers football team =

American college football season

1974 Grambling State Tigers football

Black national co-champion SWAC co-champion

Pelican Bowl, W 28–7 vs. South Carolina State
- Conference: Southwestern Athletic Conference

Ranking
- AP: No. 7
- Record: 11–1 (5–1 SWAC)
- Head coach: Eddie Robinson (32nd season)
- Home stadium: Grambling Stadium

1974 Southwestern Athletic Conference football standings
	Conf.					Overall
Team	W		L		T	W		L		T
No. 7 Grambling State +	5	–	1	–	0	11	–	1	–	0
No. 14 Alcorn State +^	5	–	1	–	0	9	–	2	–	0
No. 10 Jackson State	4	–	2	–	0	7	–	3	–	0
No. 12 Southern	3	–	3	–	0	8	–	3	–	0
Texas Southern	3	–	3	–	0	6	–	4	–	0
Mississippi Valley State	1	–	5	–	0	5	–	5	–	0
Prairie View A&M	0	–	6	–	0	0	–	10	–	0
+ – Conference co-champions; ^ – NCAA Division II playoff participant; Rankings from AP small college poll for Grambling State and Alconrn State and NAIA Division I poll for Jackson State and Southern

The 1974 Grambling Tigers football team represented Grambling State University as a member of the Southwestern Athletic Conference (SWAC) during the 1974 NCAA Division II football season. In its 32nd season under head coach Eddie Robinson, Grambling compiled an 11–1 record (5–1 against conference opponents), tied for the SWAC championship, defeated South Carolina State in the Pelican Bowl, and outscored opponents by a total of 308 to 120. The team was recognized as the 1974 black college football national co-champion and was ranked No. 7 by the Associated Press in the final small college rankings.

Key players included freshman quarterback Doug Williams and split end Dwight Scales, who led the team in scoring with 11 touchdowns. Williams later played nine seasons in the National Football League (NFL). Scales went on to play eight seasons NFL.

== Schedule ==
Date	Opponent	Rank	Site	Result	Attendance	Source
September 14	vs. Northwestern State*		State Fair Stadium; Shreveport, LA	W 14–13	30,000	
September 21	Alcorn State	No. 5	Grambling Stadium; Grambling, LA	L 14–19	17,200–17,859	
September 28	vs. Morgan State*	No. 14	Robert F. Kennedy Memorial Stadium; Washington, DC	W 14–0	32,000	
October 5	vs. Prairie View A&M	No. 13	Cotton Bowl; Dallas, TX	W 61–0	46,775	
October 12	No. 5 Tennessee State*	No. 12	Grambling Stadium; Grambling, LA	W 21–7	15,582–16,000	
October 19	at Mississippi Valley State	No. 7	Magnolia Stadium; Itta Bena, MS	W 20–14	6,000	
October 26	Jackson State	No. 6	Grambling Stadium; Grambling, LA	W 26–13	16,000–18,727	
November 2	at Texas Southern	No. 6	Houston Astrodome; Houston, TX	W 34–21	41,867	
November 9	vs. North Carolina A&T*	No. 6	Shea Stadium; Flushing, NY	W 39–16	30,000–31,000	
November 16	Norfolk State^{†}*	No. 6	Grambling Stadium; Grambling, LA	W 16–10	7,000	
November 23	vs. Southern	No. 7	Tulane Stadium; New Orleans, LA (Bayou Classic)	W 21–0	76,700–76,753	
December 7	vs. South Carolina State*	No. 7	Tulane Stadium; New Orleans, LA (Pelican Bowl)	W 28–7	30,120	
*Non-conference game; ^{†}Homecoming; Rankings from AP Poll released prior to the game

== Roster ==
1974 Grambling State Tigers football team roster
Players
Coaches
Offense

Pos.	#	Name	Class
QB	12	Doug Williams	Fr
WR	42	Dwight Scales	Jr
WR	17	Carlos Pennywell	Fr

Defense

Pos.	#	Name	Class
DE		Bob Barber	Sr
DT	79	Gary Johnson	Sr
DE		Jessie O'Neal	Sr

Special teams

Pos.	#	Name	Class

Head coach

- Eddie Robinson

Coordinators/assistant coaches

Legend

- (C) Team captain
- (S) Suspended
- (I) Ineligible
- Injured
- Redshirt

== Game summaries ==
=== Jackson State ===
Team	1	2	3	4	Total
Tigers	0	0	7	6	13
• No. 6 Tigers	0	7	12	7	26

- Date: October 26
- Location: Grambling Stadium,
  Grambling, LA

Scoring summary
2	GSU	Scales 14-yard pass from Williams (Zeno kick)	GSU 7–0
3	GSU	Williams 1-yard run (kick failed)	GSU 13–0
3	JSU	Wadley 41-yard pass from Lewis (Perry kick)	GSU 13–7
3	GSU	Pennywell 22-yard pass from Williams (kick failed)	GSU 19–7
4	JSU	Payton 1-yard run (kick failed)	GSU 19–13
4	GSU	Martin 1-yard run (Zeno kick)	GSU 26–13

== 1975 NFL draft ==
Player	Position	Round	Pick	NFL club
Gary Johnson	Defensive tackle	1	8	San Diego Chargers
Bob Barber	Defensive end	2	51	Pittsburgh Steelers
Jesse O'Neal	Defensive end	6	146	Houston Oilers
