= 1974 Sam Houston State Bearkats football team =

American college football season

1974 Sam Houston State Bearkats football
- Conference: Lone Star Conference
- Record: 4–7 (4–5 LSC)
- Head coach: Billy Tidwell (1st season)
- Home stadium: Pritchett Field

1974 Lone Star Conference football standings
	Conf.					Overall
Team	W		L		T	W		L		T
No. 1/3 Texas A&I $^	9	–	0	–	0	13	–	0	–	0
No. 5 Stephen F. Austin	7	–	2	–	0	9	–	2	–	0
Abilene Christian	6	–	3	–	0	7	–	4	–	0
Southwest Texas State	6	–	3	–	0	6	–	4	–	0
East Texas State	5	–	4	–	0	7	–	4	–	0
Howard Payne	4	–	5	–	0	5	–	6	–	0
Sam Houston State	4	–	5	–	0	4	–	7	–	0
Angelo State	3	–	4	–	0	4	–	6	–	0
Sul Ross	1	–	8	–	0	1	–	9	–	0
Tarleton State	0	–	9	–	0	1	–	10	–	0
$ – Conference champion; ^ – NAIA Division I playoff participant; Rankings from NAIA Division I poll and AP small college poll

The 1974 Sam Houston State Bearkats football team represented Sam Houston State University as a member of the Lone Star Conference (LSC) during the 1974 NAIA Division I football season. Led by first-year head coach Billy Tidwell, the Bearkats compiled an overall record of 2–8 with a mark of 4–5 in conference play, and finished tied for sixth in the LSC.

== Schedule ==
Date	Opponent	Site	Result	Attendance	Source
September 14	at Texas Southern*	Houston Astrodome; Houston, TX	L 15–17		
September 21	at Southwestern State (OK)*	Milam Stadium; Weatherford, OK	L 14–34	5,500	
September 28	East Texas State	Pritchett Field; Huntsville, TX	W 17–16		
October 5	Sul Ross	Pritchett Field; Huntsville, TX	W 28–7		
October 12	at Angelo State	San Angelo Stadium; San Angelo, TX	W 27–21		
October 19	Tarleton State	Pritchett Field; Huntsville, TX	W 35–0		
October 26	Southwest Texas State	Pritchett Field; Huntsville, TX	L 20–6		
November 2	at Howard Payne	Cen-Tex Stadium; Brownwood, TX	L 6–17		
November 9	at Texas A&I	Javelina Stadium; Kingsville, TX	L 14–34	14,000	
November 16	Abilene Christian	Pritchett Field; Huntsville, TX	L 24–33		
November 23	at Stephen F. Austin	Lumberjack Stadium; Nacogdoches, TX (rivalry)	L 18–26		
*Non-conference game
