= 1974 Southwestern Louisiana Ragin' Cajuns football team =

American college football season

1974 Southwestern Louisiana Ragin' Cajuns football
- Conference: Southland Conference
- Record: 2–9 (0–5 Southland)
- Head coach: Augie Tammariello (1st season)
- Home stadium: Cajun Field

1974 Southland Conference football standings
	Conf.					Overall
Team	W		L		T	W		L		T
No. 2 Louisiana Tech $^	5	–	0	–	0	11	–	1	–	0
Lamar	4	–	1	–	0	8	–	2	–	0
Arkansas State	3	–	2	–	0	7	–	3	–	0
McNeese State	2	–	3	–	0	6	–	4	–	1
UT Arlington	1	–	4	–	0	1	–	10	–	0
SW Louisiana	0	–	5	–	0	2	–	9	–	0
$ – Conference champion; ^ – NCAA Division II playoff participant; Rankings from AP small college poll

The 1974 Southwestern Louisiana Ragin' Cajuns football team was an American football team that represented the University of Southwestern Louisiana (now known as the University of Louisiana at Lafayette) in the Southland Conference during the 1974 NCAA Division II football season. In their first year under head coach Augie Tammariello, the team compiled a 2–9 record.

== Schedule ==
Date	Opponent	Site	Result	Attendance	Source
September 14	at Tulane*	Tulane Stadium; New Orleans, LA	L 16–17	29,878	
September 21	at McNeese State	Cowboy Stadium; Lake Charles, LA (Cajun Crown)	L 0–38	16,500	
October 5	Lamar	Cajun Field; Lafayette, LA	L 13–38	17,300	
October 12	Louisiana Tech	Cajun Field; Lafayette, LA	L 20–35	9,637	
October 19	at Tampa*	Tangerine Bowl; Orlando, FL	L 13–14	5,176	
October 26	Chattanooga*	Cajun Field; Lafayette, LA	W 21–20	18,856	
November 2	Southern Miss*	Cajun Field; Lafayette, LA	L 7–41		
November 9	at UT Arlington	Arlington Stadium; Arlington, TX	L 17–21		
November 16	at Northwestern State*	Demon Stadium; Natchitoches, LA	W 14–10	4,000	
November 22	San Jose State*	Cajun Field; Lafayette, LA	L 22–25	8,653	
November 29	Arkansas State	Cajun Field; Lafayette, LA	L 6–28	6,483–6,831	
*Non-conference game
