= 1974 Louisiana Tech Bulldogs football team =

American college football season

1974 Louisiana Tech Bulldogs football

UPI small college national champion Southland champion

Pioneer Bowl, L 14–35 vs. Central Michigan
- Conference: Southland Conference

Ranking
- AP: No. 2
- Record: 11–1 (5–0 Southland)
- Head coach: Maxie Lambright (8th season)
- Captains: Randy Crouch; Roland Harper
- Home stadium: Joe Aillet Stadium

1974 Southland Conference football standings
	Conf.					Overall
Team	W		L		T	W		L		T
No. 2 Louisiana Tech $^	5	–	0	–	0	11	–	1	–	0
Lamar	4	–	1	–	0	8	–	2	–	0
Arkansas State	3	–	2	–	0	7	–	3	–	0
McNeese State	2	–	3	–	0	6	–	4	–	1
UT Arlington	1	–	4	–	0	1	–	10	–	0
SW Louisiana	0	–	5	–	0	2	–	9	–	0
$ – Conference champion; ^ – NCAA Division II playoff participant; Rankings from AP small college poll

The 1974 Louisiana Tech Bulldogs football team was an American football team that represented Louisiana Tech University as a member of the Southland Conference during the 1974 NCAA Division II football season. In their eighth year under head coach Maxie Lambright, the team compiled an 11–1 record, were UPI College Division national champion, Southland Conference champion, and lost to Central Michigan in the Pioneer Bowl.

== Schedule ==
Date	Opponent	Rank	Site	Result	Attendance	Source
September 7	Illinois State*		Joe Aillet Stadium; Ruston, LA	W 16–7	17,400	
September 21	at UT Arlington	No. 2	Cotton Bowl; Dallas, TX	W 42–15	4,419	
September 28	at Arkansas State	No. 1	Indian Stadium; Jonesboro, AR	W 20–7	10,231	
October 12	at Southwestern Louisiana	No. 1	Cajun Field; Lafayette, LA (rivalry)	W 35–20	9,637	
October 19	vs. Northwestern State*	No. 1	State Fair Stadium; Shreveport, LA (rivalry)	W 34–0	26,000	
October 26	No. 10 McNeese State	No. 1	Joe Aillet Stadium; Ruston, LA	W 24–17	22,058	
November 2	Southeastern Louisiana*	No. 1	Joe Aillet Stadium; Ruston, LA	W 34–13	16,700	
November 9	Lamar	No. 1	Joe Aillet Stadium; Ruston, LA	W 28–0	16,231	
November 16	at Chattanooga*	No. 1	Chamberlain Field; Chattanooga, TN	W 35–14	6,327	
November 23	at Northeast Louisiana*	No. 1	Brown Stadium; Monroe, LA (rivalry)	W 26–10	9,000	
November 30	No. 8 Western Carolina*	No. 1	Joe Aillet Stadium; Ruston, LA (NCAA Division II Quarterfinal)	W 10–7	12,200	
December 7	vs. No. 6 Central Michigan*	No. 1	Memorial Stadium; Wichita Falls, TX (Pioneer Bowl—NCAA Division II Semifinal)	L 14–35	12,200	
*Non-conference game; Rankings from AP Poll released prior to the game
