= 1974 Miami Redskins football team =

American college football season

1974 Miami Redskins football

MAC champion Tangerine Bowl champion

Tangerine Bowl, W 21–10 vs. Georgia
- Conference: Mid-American Conference

Ranking
- Coaches: No. 10
- AP: No. 10
- Record: 10–0–1 (5–0 MAC)
- Head coach: Dick Crum (1st season)
- Defensive coordinator: Joe Novak (1st season)
- Home stadium: Miami Field

1974 Mid-American Conference football standings
	Conf.					Overall
Team	W		L		T	W		L		T
No. 10 Miami (OH) $	5	–	0	–	0	10	–	0	–	1
Ohio	3	–	2	–	0	6	–	5	–	0
Toledo	3	–	2	–	0	6	–	5	–	0
Kent State	2	–	3	–	0	7	–	4	–	0
Bowling Green	2	–	3	–	0	6	–	4	–	1
Western Michigan	0	–	5	–	0	3	–	8	–	0
$ – Conference champion; Rankings from AP Poll

The 1974 Miami Redskins football team was an American football team that represented Miami University during the 1974 NCAA Division I football season. In their first season under head coach Dick Crum, the Redskins won the Mid-American Conference (MAC) championship, compiled a 10–0–1 record (5–0 against MAC opponents), outscored all opponents by a combined total of 303 to 86, defeated Georgia, by a score of 21–10 in the 1974 Tangerine Bowl, and were ranked #10 in the final AP Poll.

The team's statistical leaders included quarterback Steve Sanna with 724 passing yards, fullback Randy Walker with 873 rushing yards, and Jack Schulte with 352 receiving yards.

== Schedule ==
Date	Opponent	Rank	Site	TV	Result	Attendance	Source
September 7	Eastern Michigan*		Miami Field; Oxford, OH		W 39–0	6,700	
September 21	at Purdue*		Ross–Ade Stadium; West Lafayette, IN		T 7–7	55,322	
September 28	at Marshall*		Fairfield Stadium; Huntington, WV		W 42–0	10,217	
October 5	at Kentucky*		Commonwealth Stadium; Lexington, KY		W 14–10	52,000	
October 12	at Ohio	No. 20	Peden Stadium; Athens, OH (rivalry)		W 31–3	17,520	
October 19	Bowling Green	No. 19	Miami Field; Oxford, OH		W 34–10	18,150	
October 26	at Toledo	No. 19	Glass Bowl; Toledo, OH		W 38–22	19,583	
November 2	Western Michigan	No. 16	Miami Field; Oxford, OH		W 31–0		
November 9	Kent State	No. 13	Miami Field; Oxford, OH		W 19–17	7,400	
November 16	at Cincinnati*	No. 12	Nippert Stadium; Cincinnati, OH (rivalry)		W 27–7	23,342	
December 21	vs. Georgia*	No. 15	Tangerine Bowl; Orlando, FL (Tangerine Bowl)	Mizlou	W 21–10	20,246	
*Non-conference game; Rankings from AP Poll released prior to the game
