= 1974 Prairie View A&M Panthers football team =

American college football season

1974 Prairie View A&M Panthers football
- Conference: Southwestern Athletic Conference
- Record: 0–10 (0–6 SWAC)
- Head coach: Hoover J. Wright (5th season)
- Home stadium: Edward L. Blackshear Field

1974 Southwestern Athletic Conference football standings
	Conf.					Overall
Team	W		L		T	W		L		T
No. 7 Grambling State +	5	–	1	–	0	11	–	1	–	0
No. 14 Alcorn State +^	5	–	1	–	0	9	–	2	–	0
No. 10 Jackson State	4	–	2	–	0	7	–	3	–	0
No. 12 Southern	3	–	3	–	0	8	–	3	–	0
Texas Southern	3	–	3	–	0	6	–	4	–	0
Mississippi Valley State	1	–	5	–	0	5	–	5	–	0
Prairie View A&M	0	–	6	–	0	0	–	10	–	0
+ – Conference co-champions; ^ – NCAA Division II playoff participant; Rankings from AP small college poll for Grambling State and Alconrn State and NAIA Division I poll for Jackson State and Southern

The 1974 Prairie View A&M Panthers football team represented Prairie View A&M University as a member of the Southwestern Athletic Conference (SWAC) during the 1974 NCAA Division II football season. Led by fifth-year head coach Hoover J. Wright, the Panthers compiled an overall record of 0–10, with a conference record of 0–6, and finished seventh in the SWAC.

== Schedule ==
Date	Opponent	Site	Result	Attendance	Source
September 14	vs. East Texas State*	Cotton Bowl; Dallas, TX	L 0–26		
September 21	at Jackson State	Mississippi Veterans Memorial Stadium; Jackson, MS	L 7–67	18,000	
September 28	at Southern	University Stadium; Baton Rouge, LA	L 7–34	16,000	
October 5	vs. No. 13 Grambling State	Cotton Bowl; Dallas, TX	L 0–61	46,775	
October 12	at No. 6 UNLV*	Las Vegas Stadium; Whitney, NV	L 28–63	8,915	
October 26	at Bishop*	P.C. Cobb Stadium; Dallas, TX	L 14–21		
November 2	at Mississippi Valley State	Magnolia Stadium; Itta Bena, MS	L 7–30		
November 9	Arkansas–Pine Bluff*	Edward L. Blackshear Field; Prairie View, TX	L 5–13		
November 16	No. 9 Alcorn State	Edward L. Blackshear Field; Prairie View, TX	L 0–48	8,000	
November 23	at Texas Southern	Astrodome; Houston, TX (rivalry)	L 13–33	14,664	
*Non-conference game; Rankings from AP Poll released prior to the game
