= 1974 Bowling Green Falcons football team =

American college football season

1974 Bowling Green Falcons football
- Conference: Mid-American Conference
- Record: 6–4–1 (2–3 MAC)
- Head coach: Don Nehlen (7th season)
- Home stadium: Doyt Perry Stadium

1974 Mid-American Conference football standings
	Conf.					Overall
Team	W		L		T	W		L		T
No. 10 Miami (OH) $	5	–	0	–	0	10	–	0	–	1
Ohio	3	–	2	–	0	6	–	5	–	0
Toledo	3	–	2	–	0	6	–	5	–	0
Kent State	2	–	3	–	0	7	–	4	–	0
Bowling Green	2	–	3	–	0	6	–	4	–	1
Western Michigan	0	–	5	–	0	3	–	8	–	0
$ – Conference champion; Rankings from AP Poll

The 1974 Bowling Green Falcons football team was an American football team that represented Bowling Green University in the Mid-American Conference (MAC) during the 1974 NCAA Division I football season. In their seventh season under head coach Don Nehlen, the Falcons compiled a 6–4–1 record (2–3 against MAC opponents), finished in fifth place in the MAC, and outscored their opponents by a combined total of 249 to 203.

The team's statistical leaders included Mark Miller with 725 passing yards, Dave Preston with 1,414 rushing yards, and John Boles with 291 receiving yards.

== Schedule ==
Date	Opponent	Site	Result	Attendance	Source
September 14	at East Carolina*	Ficklen Memorial Stadium; Greenville, NC	L 6–24	16,500	
September 21	Dayton*	Doyt Perry Stadium; Bowling Green, OH	W 41–21	11,653	
September 28	at Western Michigan	Waldo Stadium; Kalamazoo, MI	W 21–13		
October 5	at Toledo	Glass Bowl; Toledo, OH (rivalry)	L 19–24	21,007	
October 12	Kent State	Doyt L. Perry Stadium; Bowling Green, OH (rivalry)	W 26–10	10,493	
October 19	at Miami (OH)	Miami Field; Oxford, OH	L 10–34	18,150	
October 26	Marshall*	Doyt L. Perry Stadium; Bowling Green, OH	W 28–3	13,636	
November 2	Ohio	Doyt Perry Stadium; Bowling Green, OH	L 22–33	17,753	
November 9	Arkansas State*	Doyt Perry Stadium; Bowling Green, OH	W 17–0	11,334	
November 16	at Southern Miss*	Ladd Stadium; Mobile, AL	W 38–20	3,571	
November 23	at San Diego State*	San Diego Stadium; San Diego, CA	T 21–21	24,178	
*Non-conference game
