= 1974 Toledo Rockets football team =

American college football season

1974 Toledo Rockets football
- Conference: Mid-American Conference
- Record: 6–5 (3–2 MAC)
- Head coach: Jack Murphy (4th season)
- Defensive coordinator: Dan Simrell (2nd season)
- Home stadium: Glass Bowl

1974 Mid-American Conference football standings
	Conf.					Overall
Team	W		L		T	W		L		T
No. 10 Miami (OH) $	5	–	0	–	0	10	–	0	–	1
Ohio	3	–	2	–	0	6	–	5	–	0
Toledo	3	–	2	–	0	6	–	5	–	0
Kent State	2	–	3	–	0	7	–	4	–	0
Bowling Green	2	–	3	–	0	6	–	4	–	1
Western Michigan	0	–	5	–	0	3	–	8	–	0
$ – Conference champion; Rankings from AP Poll

The 1974 Toledo Rockets football team was an American football team that represented the University of Toledo in the Mid-American Conference (MAC) during the 1974 NCAA Division I football season. In their fourth season under head coach Jack Murphy, the Rockets compiled a 6–5 record (3–2 against MAC opponents), finished in a tie for second place in the MAC, and were outscored by all opponents by a combined total of 270 to 262.

The team's statistical leaders included Gene Swick with 2,234 passing yards, Mike Taormina with 609 rushing yards, and John Ross with 866 receiving yards.

== Schedule ==
Date	Opponent	Site	Result	Attendance	Source
September 14	at Tampa*	Tampa Stadium; Tampa, FL	L 13–47	22,687	
September 21	Villanova*	Glass Bowl; Toledo, OH	L 0–7	14,871	
September 28	at Ohio	Peden Stadium; Athens, OH	W 19–16	15,021	
October 5	Bowling Green	Glass Bowl; Toledo, OH (rivalry)	W 24–19	21,007	
October 12	at Western Michigan	Waldo Stadium; Kalamazoo, MI	W 31–24	23,750	
October 19	at Dayton*	Welcome Stadium; Dayton, OH	W 38–27	11,228	
October 26	No. 19 Miami (OH)	Glass Bowl; Toledo, OH	L 22–38	19,583	
November 2	Northern Illinois*	Glass Bowl; Toledo, OH	W 44–14	12,326	
November 9	Marshall*	Glass Bowl; Toledo, OH	W 45–15		
November 16	at Kent State	Dix Stadium; Kent, OH	L 14–35	7,400	
November 23	Eastern Michigan*	Glass Bowl; Toledo, OH	L 12–28	9,894	
*Non-conference game; Rankings from AP Poll released prior to the game
