= 1974 North Carolina A&T Aggies football team =

American college football season

1974 North Carolina A&T Aggies football
- Conference: Mid-Eastern Athletic Conference
- Record: 5–6 (2–4 MEAC)
- Head coach: Hornsby Howell (7th season)
- Home stadium: World War Memorial Stadium

1974 Mid-Eastern Athletic Conference football standings
	Conf.					Overall
Team	W		L		T	W		L		T
No. 11 South Carolina State $	5	–	1	–	0	8	–	4	–	0
Howard	4	–	1	–	1	8	–	2	–	1
North Carolina Central	4	–	1	–	1	7	–	2	–	2
Morgan State	4	–	2	–	0	5	–	5	–	0
North Carolina A&T	2	–	4	–	0	5	–	6	–	0
Maryland Eastern Shore	1	–	5	–	0	2	–	6	–	0
Delaware State	0	–	6	–	0	3	–	6	–	0
$ – Conference champion; Rankings from NAIA Division I poll

The 1974 North Carolina A&T Aggies football team represented North Carolina A&T State University as a member of the Mid-Eastern Athletic Conference (MEAC) during the 1974 NCAA Division II football season. Led by seventh-year head coach Hornsby Howell, the Aggies compiled an overall record of 5–6, with a mark of 2–4 in conference play, and finished fifth in the MEAC.

== Schedule ==
Date	Opponent	Site	Result	Attendance	Source
September 14	Elizabeth City State*	World War Memorial Stadium; Greensboro, NC (rivalry)	W 28–16	11,000	
September 21	South Carolina State	World War Memorial Stadium; Greensboro, NC (rivalry)	L 0–8	11,200–12,870	
September 28	at Florida A&M*	Bragg Memorial Stadium; Tallahassee, FL	L 19–28	13,086	
October 5	at Johnson C. Smith*	American Legion Memorial Stadium; Charlotte, NC	W 28–15	9,000	
October 12	Norfolk State*	World War Memorial Stadium; Greensboro, NC	W 8–6	9,220	
October 19	at Maryland Eastern Shore	Princess Anne, MD	W 20–6	3,000	
October 26	at Howard	RFK Stadium; Washington, DC	L 9–13	19,697	
November 2	Morgan State	World War Memorial Stadium; Greensboro, NC	L 0–20	19,056–20,000	
November 9	vs. No. 6 Grambling State*	Shea Stadium; Flushing, NY	L 16–39	30,000–31,000	
November 16	Delaware State	World War Memorial Stadium; Greensboro, NC	W 20–14	3,500	
November 23	vs. North Carolina Central	Wallace Wade Stadium; Durham, NC (rivalry)	L 18–29		
*Non-conference game; Rankings from AP Poll released prior to the game
