= 1974 Marshall Thundering Herd football team =

American college football season

1974 Marshall Thundering Herd football
- Conference: Independent
- Record: 1–10
- Head coach: Jack Lengyel (4th season)
- Captains: Allen Meadows; Jesse Smith
- Home stadium: Fairfield Stadium

1974 NCAA Division I independents football records
	Conf.			Overall
Team	W	L	T	W		L		T
No. 6 Notre Dame		–		10	–	2	–	0
No. 7 Penn State		–		10	–	2	–	0
Temple		–		8	–	2	–	0
Boston College		–		8	–	3	–	0
Utah State		–		8	–	3	–	0
No. 19 Houston		–		8	–	3	–	1
Rutgers		–		7	–	3	–	1
Cincinnati		–		7	–	4	–	0
Memphis State		–		7	–	4	–	0
Pittsburgh		–		7	–	4	–	0
Georgia Tech		–		6	–	5	–	0
Hawaii		–		6	–	5	–	0
Miami (FL)		–		6	–	5	–	0
Southern Miss		–		6	–	5	–	0
Tampa		–		6	–	5	–	0
Holy Cross		–		5	–	5	–	1
Tulane		–		5	–	6	–	0
Colgate		–		4	–	6	–	0
Northern Illinois		–		4	–	7	–	0
Navy		–		4	–	7	–	0
South Carolina		–		4	–	7	–	0
Virginia Tech		–		4	–	7	–	0
West Virginia		–		4	–	7	–	0
Army		–		3	–	8	–	0
Dayton		–		3	–	8	–	0
Villanova		–		3	–	8	–	0
Air Force		–		2	–	9	–	0
Southern Illinois		–		2	–	9	–	0
Syracuse		–		2	–	9	–	0
Florida State		–		1	–	10	–	0
Marshall		–		1	–	10	–	0
Rankings from AP Poll

The 1974 Marshall Thundering Herd football team was an American football team that represented Marshall University as an independent during the 1974 NCAA Division I football season. In its fourth and final season under head coach Jack Lengyel, the team compiled a 1–10 record and was outscored by a total of 291 to 110. Allen Meadows and Jesse Smith were the team captains. The team played its home games at Fairfield Stadium in Huntington, West Virginia.

== Schedule ==
Date	Opponent	Site	Result	Attendance	Source
September 14	at Morehead State	Jayne Stadium; Morehead, KY	L 12–14		
September 21	Akron	Fairfield Stadium; Huntington, WV	W 17–7	10,782	
September 28	Miami (OH)	Fairfield Stadium; Huntington, WV	L 0–42	10,217	
October 5	at Temple	Temple Stadium; Philadelphia, PA	L 10–31	10,417	
October 12	Northern Illinois	Fairfield Stadium; Huntington, WV	L 17–20		
October 19	Western Michigan^{†}	Fairfield Stadium; Huntington, WV	L 17–20		
October 26	at Bowling Green	Doyt Perry Stadium; Bowling Green, OH	L 3–28	13,636	
November 2	Kent State	Fairfield Stadium; Huntington, WV	L 7–35	9,121	
November 9	at Toledo	Glass Bowl; Toledo, OH	L 14–45		
November 16	at Dayton	Welcome Stadium; Dayton, OH	L 13–14	5,300	
November 23	at Ohio	Peden Stadium; Athens, OH (rivalry)	L 0–35	7,043	
^{†}Homecoming
