= 1974 Mississippi Valley State Delta Devils football team =

American college football season

1974 Mississippi Valley State Delta Devils football
- Conference: Southwestern Athletic Conference
- Record: 5–5 (1–5 SWAC)
- Head coach: Davis Weathersby (5th season)
- Home stadium: Magnolia Stadium

1974 Southwestern Athletic Conference football standings
	Conf.					Overall
Team	W		L		T	W		L		T
No. 7 Grambling State +	5	–	1	–	0	11	–	1	–	0
No. 14 Alcorn State +^	5	–	1	–	0	9	–	2	–	0
No. 10 Jackson State	4	–	2	–	0	7	–	3	–	0
No. 12 Southern	3	–	3	–	0	8	–	3	–	0
Texas Southern	3	–	3	–	0	6	–	4	–	0
Mississippi Valley State	1	–	5	–	0	5	–	5	–	0
Prairie View A&M	0	–	6	–	0	0	–	10	–	0
+ – Conference co-champions; ^ – NCAA Division II playoff participant; Rankings from AP small college poll for Grambling State and Alconrn State and NAIA Division I poll for Jackson State and Southern

The 1974 Mississippi Valley State Delta Devils football team represented Mississippi Valley State University as a member of the Southwestern Athletic Conference (SWAC) during the 1974 NCAA Division II football season. Led by fifth-year head coach Davis Weathersby, the Delta Devils compiled an overall record of 5–5, with a conference record of 1–5, and finished sixth in the SWAC.

== Schedule ==
Date	Opponent	Site	Result	Attendance	Source
September 14	Alabama A&M*	Magnolia Stadium; Itta Bena, MS	W 16–15	8,000	
September 21	at Arkansas–Pine Bluff*	Pumphrey Stadium; Pine Bluff, AR	W 17–0	6,000	
September 28	at Jackson State	Mississippi Veterans Memorial Stadium; Jackson, MS	L 6–25	21,000	
October 5	Southern	Magnolia Stadium; Itta Bena, MS	L 17–21	8,500	
October 19	No. 7 Grambling State	Magnolia Stadium; Itta Bena, MS	L 14–20	6,000	
October 26	at Texas Southern	Jeppesen Stadium; Houston, TX	L 34–35	9,000	
November 2	Prairie View A&M	Magnolia Stadium; Itta Bena, MS	W 30–7	7,000	
November 9	No. 9 Alcorn State	Magnolia Stadium; Itta Bena, MS	L 21–30	15,235	
November 23	at Bishop*	Dallas, TX	W 63–14	5,000	
November 28	at Alabama State*	Cramton Bowl; Montgomery, AL	W 24–17	12,000	
*Non-conference game; Rankings from AP Poll released prior to the game
