= 1974 Ohio Bobcats football team =

American college football season

1974 Ohio Bobcats football
- Conference: Mid-American Conference
- Record: 6–5 (3–2 MAC)
- Head coach: Bill Hess (17th season)
- Home stadium: Peden Stadium

1974 Mid-American Conference football standings
	Conf.					Overall
Team	W		L		T	W		L		T
No. 10 Miami (OH) $	5	–	0	–	0	10	–	0	–	1
Ohio	3	–	2	–	0	6	–	5	–	0
Toledo	3	–	2	–	0	6	–	5	–	0
Kent State	2	–	3	–	0	7	–	4	–	0
Bowling Green	2	–	3	–	0	6	–	4	–	1
Western Michigan	0	–	5	–	0	3	–	8	–	0
$ – Conference champion; Rankings from AP Poll

The 1974 Ohio Bobcats football team was an American football team that represented Ohio University in the Mid-American Conference (MAC) during the 1974 NCAA Division I football season. In their 17th season under head coach Bill Hess, the Bobcats compiled a 6–5 record (3–2 against MAC opponents), finished in a tie for second place in the MAC, and outscored all opponents by a combined total of 249 to 211. They played their home games in Peden Stadium in Athens, Ohio.

== Schedule ==
Date	Opponent	Site	Result	Attendance	Source
September 14	at North Carolina*	Kenan Memorial Stadium; Chapel Hill, NC	L 7–42	33,000	
September 21	at Kent State	Dix Stadium; Kent, OH	W 20–0	15,267	
September 28	Toledo	Peden Stadium; Athens, OH	L 16–19	15,021	
October 5	Northern Illinois*	Peden Stadium; Athens, OH	W 31–14		
October 12	No. 20 Miami (OH)	Peden Stadium; Athens, OH (rivalry)	L 3–31	17,520	
October 19	Morehead State*	Peden Stadium; Athens, OH	W 49–10	10,222	
October 26	at Western Michigan	Waldo Stadium; Kalamazoo, MI	W 26–3	16,500	
November 2	at Bowling Green	Doyt Perry Stadium; Bowling Green, OH	W 33–22	17,753	
November 9	at Cincinnati*	Nippert Stadium; Cincinnati, OH	L 13–35	12,324	
November 16	at No. 11 Penn State*	Beaver Stadium; University Park, PA	L 16–35	58,700	
November 23	Marshall*	Peden Stadium; Athens, OH (rivalry)	W 35–0	7,043	
*Non-conference game; Rankings from AP Poll released prior to the game
