= 1974 McNeese State Cowboys football team =

American college football season

1974 McNeese State Cowboys football
- Conference: Southland Conference
- Record: 6–4–1 (2–3 Southland)
- Head coach: Jack Doland (5th season)
- Home stadium: Cowboy Stadium

1974 Southland Conference football standings
	Conf.					Overall
Team	W		L		T	W		L		T
No. 2 Louisiana Tech $^	5	–	0	–	0	11	–	1	–	0
Lamar	4	–	1	–	0	8	–	2	–	0
Arkansas State	3	–	2	–	0	7	–	3	–	0
McNeese State	2	–	3	–	0	6	–	4	–	1
UT Arlington	1	–	4	–	0	1	–	10	–	0
SW Louisiana	0	–	5	–	0	2	–	9	–	0
$ – Conference champion; ^ – NCAA Division II playoff participant; Rankings from AP small college poll

The 1974 McNeese State Cowboys football team was an American football team that represented McNeese State University as a member of the Southland Conference (Southland) during the 1974 NCAA Division II football season. In their fifth year under head coach Jack Doland, the team compiled an overall record of 6–4–1 with a mark of 2–3 in conference play, and finished fourth in the Southland.

== Schedule ==
Date	Opponent	Rank	Site	Result	Attendance	Source
September 7	Northern Illinois*		Cowboy Stadium; Lake Charles, LA	W 19–16	11,500	
September 21	Southwestern Louisiana	No. 8	Cowboy Stadium; Lake Charles, LA (rivalry)	W 38–0	16,500	
September 28	Northeast Louisiana*	No. 5	Cowboy Stadium; Lake Charles, LA	W 20–14	11,500	
October 5	at No. 3 Delaware*	No. 5	Delaware Stadium; Newark, DE	L 24–29	19,239	
October 12	Eastern Michigan*	No. 9	Cowboy Stadium; Lake Charles, LA	T 6–6	9,000	
October 19	UT Arlington	No. 10	Cowboy Stadium; Lake Charles, LA	W 43–0	11,000	
October 26	at No. 1 Louisiana Tech	No. 10	Joe Aillet Stadium; Ruston, LA	L 17–24	22,058	
November 2	at Nicholls State*	No. 12	John L. Guidry Stadium; Thibodaux, LA	W 26–20	8,000	
November 9	Northwestern State*	No. 12	Cowboy Stadium; Lake Charles, LA (rivalry)	W 17–7	8,750	
November 16	at Lamar	No. 10	Cardinal Stadium; Beaumont, TX (rivalry)	L 3–17	11,700	
November 23	at Arkansas State	No. 15	Indian Stadium; Jonesboro, AR	L 20–22	5,881	
*Non-conference game; Rankings from AP Poll released prior to the game
