= 1974 South Carolina State Bulldogs football team =

American college football season

1974 South Carolina State Bulldogs football

MEAC champion

Pelican Bowl, L 7–28 vs. Grambling State
- Conference: Mid-Eastern Athletic Conference
- Record: 8–4 (5–1 MEAC)
- Head coach: Willie Jeffries (2nd season)
- Home stadium: State College Stadium

1974 Mid-Eastern Athletic Conference football standings
	Conf.					Overall
Team	W		L		T	W		L		T
No. 11 South Carolina State $	5	–	1	–	0	8	–	4	–	0
Howard	4	–	1	–	1	8	–	2	–	1
North Carolina Central	4	–	1	–	1	7	–	2	–	2
Morgan State	4	–	2	–	0	5	–	5	–	0
North Carolina A&T	2	–	4	–	0	5	–	6	–	0
Maryland Eastern Shore	1	–	5	–	0	2	–	6	–	0
Delaware State	0	–	6	–	0	3	–	6	–	0
$ – Conference champion; Rankings from NAIA Division I poll

The 1974 South Carolina State Bulldogs football team represented South Carolina State College (now known as South Carolina State University) as a member of the Mid-Eastern Athletic Conference (MEAC) during the 1974 NCAA Division II football season. Led by second-year head coach Willie Jeffries, the Bulldogs compiled an overall record of 8–4, with a mark of 5–1 in conference play, and finished as MEAC champion.

== Schedule ==
Date	Opponent	Site	Result	Attendance	Source
September 14	Bethune–Cookman*	State College Stadium; Orangeburg, SC	W 12–8	7,200	
September 21	at North Carolina A&T	World War Memorial Stadium; Greensboro, NC (rivalry)	W 8–0	11,200–12,870	
September 27	at Howard	RFK Stadium; Washington, DC	W 6–0	8,324–13,357	
October 5	Alcorn State*	State College Stadium; Orangeburg, SC	L 12–8	12,000	
October 12	Johnson C. Smith*	State College Stadium; Orangeburg, SC	W 36–0	7,500	
October 19	at Morgan State	Hughes Stadium; Baltimore, MD	L 17–23	5,121	
November 2	North Carolina Central	State College Stadium; Orangeburg, SC	W 21–3	4,031	
November 9	Maryland Eastern Shore^{†}	State College Stadium; Orangeburg, SC	W 10–6	12,543–15,000	
November 16	at Alabama A&M*	Milton Frank Stadium; Huntsville, AL	W 31–14	2,985	
November 23	at Delaware State	Alumni Stadium; Dover, DE	W 16–7	1,000	
November 30	at Wofford*	Synder Field; Spartanburg, SC (Textile Bowl)	L 0–20	6,442	
December 7	vs. No. 7 Grambling State*	Tulane Stadium; New Orleans, LA (Pelican Bowl)	L 7–28	30,120	
*Non-conference game; ^{†}Homecoming; Rankings from AP Poll released prior to the game
