= Augie Tammariello =

American football coach and insurance salesman

Playing career
- 1957–1959: Denver
- Position: Guard

Coaching career (HC unless noted)
- 1962–1967: William & Mary (assistant)
- 1968–1973: Colorado (OL)
- 1974–1979: Southwestern Louisiana

Head coaching record
- Overall: 30–35–2

Augie Tammariello is an American former college football coach. He served as the head football coach at the University of Southwestern Louisiana—now known as the University of Louisiana at Lafayette—from 1974 to 1979, compiling a record of 30–35–2. A native of Pittsburgh, Tammariello played college football as a guard at the University of Denver. In 1962, he was hired as an assistant coach at the College of William & Mary, where he worked under head coaches Milt Drewer and Marv Levy. He moved to the University of Colorado Boulder in 1968 to serve as an assistant under head coach Eddie Crowder.

Since leaving college football in 1987, Tammariello has served as a State Farm Agent in Asheville, North Carolina.

== Head coaching record ==
Year	Team	Overall	Conference	Standing	Bowl/playoffs
Southwestern Louisiana Ragin’ Cajuns (Southland Conference) (1974–1979)
1974	Southwestern Louisiana	2–9	0–5	6th	
1975	Southwestern Louisiana	6–5	2–3	4th	
1976	Southwestern Louisiana	9–2	4–1	2nd	
1977	Southwestern Louisiana	6–4–2	2–1–2	2nd	
1978	Southwestern Louisiana	3–8	2–3	T–4th	
1979	Southwestern Louisiana	4–7	1–4	T–4th	
Southwestern Louisiana:		30–35–2	11–17–2		
Total:		30–35–2			
