= Frank Tammariello =

American filmmaker

- Occupation: Filmmaker

Frank Tammariello is an American filmmaker and television commercial director.

== Background ==
Tammariello worked on projects for Ellen DeGeneres, Roseanne Barr, Bryan Cranston, Drew Carey, George Lopez, Martin Short and Oprah Winfrey.

He created over 100 network commercials with for HBO, Toyota, McDonald's, Burger King, Acura, Kellogg's, General Foods, Pillsbury, Avis, Budweiser, Kraft, Nabisco, Mattel, Pizza Hut, Ford Motor Company and General Motors.

== Career ==
Tammariello began his directing career in 1986 on the 'Isuzu Liar' ad campaign, where he established the comic spokesman Joe Isuzu, to whom American President Ronald Reagan once compared himself.

During his career, Tammariello received awards including a Clio Award and several One Show awards. He was featured on the covers of the Ad Age and Adweek magazines, and was honored by the Association of Independent Commercial Producers (AICP) for placing his commercials in the permanent collection of the Museum of Modern Art.
