= 1974 Delaware State Hornets football team =

American college football season

1974 Delaware State Hornets football
- Conference: Mid-Eastern Athletic Conference
- Record: 3–6 (0–6 MEAC)
- Head coach: Arnold Jeter (8th season)
- Home stadium: Alumni Stadium

1974 Mid-Eastern Athletic Conference football standings
	Conf.					Overall
Team	W		L		T	W		L		T
No. 11 South Carolina State $	5	–	1	–	0	8	–	4	–	0
Howard	4	–	1	–	1	8	–	2	–	1
North Carolina Central	4	–	1	–	1	7	–	2	–	2
Morgan State	4	–	2	–	0	5	–	5	–	0
North Carolina A&T	2	–	4	–	0	5	–	6	–	0
Maryland Eastern Shore	1	–	5	–	0	2	–	6	–	0
Delaware State	0	–	6	–	0	3	–	6	–	0
$ – Conference champion; Rankings from NAIA Division I poll

The 1974 Delaware State Hornets football team represented Delaware State College—now known as Delaware State University—as a member of the Mid-Eastern Athletic Conference (MEAC) in the 1974 NCAA Division II football season. Led by eighth-year head coach Arnold Jeter in his final season, the Hornets compiled an overall record of 3–6 and a mark of 0–6 in conference play, placing last out of seven teams in the MEAC.

== Schedule ==
Date	Opponent	Site	Result	Attendance	Source
September 7	at Elizabeth City State*	Elizabeth City, NC	W 14–8		
September 14	William Paterson*	Alumni Stadium; Dover, DE	W 34–10		
September 28	Federal City College*	Alumni Stadium; Dover, DE	W 18–8		
October 11	at Howard	RFK Stadium; Washington, DC	L 7–30	5,872	
October 19	North Carolina Central	Alumni Stadium; Dover, DE	L 0–7		
October 26	at Morgan State	Hughes Stadium; Baltimore, MD	L 7–21	10,000	
November 2	Maryland Eastern Shore	Alumni Stadium; Dover, DE	L 0–36	4,000	
November 16	at North Carolina A&T	World War Memorial Stadium; Greensboro, NC	L 14–20	3,500	
November 23	South Carolina State	Alumni Stadium; Dover, DE	L 7–16	1,000	
*Non-conference game
