= 1974 Texas Southern Tigers football team =

American college football season

1974 Texas Southern Tigers football
- Conference: Southwestern Athletic Conference
- Record: 6–4 (3–3 SWAC)
- Head coach: Rod Paige (4th season)
- Home stadium: Astrodome; Jeppesen Stadium

1974 Southwestern Athletic Conference football standings
| | Conf. | | | | | Overall |
| Team | W | | L | | T | W | | L | | T |
|---|---|---|---|---|---|---|---|---|---|---|
| No. 7 Grambling State + | 5 | – | 1 | – | 0 | 11 | – | 1 | – | 0 |
| No. 14 Alcorn State +^ | 5 | – | 1 | – | 0 | 9 | – | 2 | – | 0 |
| No. 10 Jackson State | 4 | – | 2 | – | 0 | 7 | – | 3 | – | 0 |
| No. 12 Southern | 3 | – | 3 | – | 0 | 8 | – | 3 | – | 0 |
| Texas Southern | 3 | – | 3 | – | 0 | 6 | – | 4 | – | 0 |
| Mississippi Valley State | 1 | – | 5 | – | 0 | 5 | – | 5 | – | 0 |
| Prairie View A&M | 0 | – | 6 | – | 0 | 0 | – | 10 | – | 0 |
+ – Conference co-champions; ^ – NCAA Division II playoff participant; Rankings from AP small college poll for Grambling State and Alconrn State and NAIA Division I poll for Jackson State and Southern

The 1974 Texas Southern Tigers football team was an American football team that represented Texas Southern University as a member of the Southwestern Athletic Conference (SWAC) during the 1974 NCAA Division II football season. Led by fourth-year head coach Rod Paige, the Tigers compiled an overall record of 6–4, with a mark of 3–3 in conference play, and finished tied for fourth in the SWAC.

== Schedule ==
| Date | Opponent | Site | Result | Attendance | Source |
|---|---|---|---|---|---|
| September 14 | Sam Houston State* | Astrodome; Houston, TX | W 17–15 | 15,407 | |
| September 21 | Southern | Jeppesen Stadium; Houston, TX | W 14–6 | 22,000 | |
| September 28 | at Tennessee State* | Hale Stadium; Nashville, TN | L 6–27 | 14,000 | |
| October 12 | at Alcorn State | Henderson Stadium; Lorman, MS | L 34–37 | 19,000 | |
| October 19 | Bishop* | Jeppesen Stadium; Houston, TX | W 42–6 | | |
| October 26 | Mississippi Valley State | Jeppesen Stadium; Houston, TX | W 35–34 | | |
| November 2 | No. 6 Grambling State | Astrodome; Houston, TX | L 21–34 | 41,867 | |
| November 9 | at Jackson State | Mississippi Veterans Memorial Stadium; Jackson, MS | L 28–34 | 20,000 | |
| November 16 | vs. Langston* | Taft Stadium; Oklahoma City, OK | W 33–13 | | |
| November 23 | Prairie View A&M | Astrodome; Houston, TX (rivalry) | W 33–13 | 14,664 | |
*Non-conference game; Rankings from AP Poll released prior to the game
