= 1974 Kent State Golden Flashes football team =

American college football season

1974 Kent State Golden Flashes football
- Conference: Mid-American Conference
- Record: 7–4 (2–3 MAC)
- Head coach: Don James (4th season)
- Offensive coordinator: Dick Scesniak (4th season)
- Defensive coordinator: Dennis Fitzgerald (4th season)
- Home stadium: Dix Stadium

1974 Mid-American Conference football standings
	Conf.					Overall
Team	W		L		T	W		L		T
No. 10 Miami (OH) $	5	–	0	–	0	10	–	0	–	1
Ohio	3	–	2	–	0	6	–	5	–	0
Toledo	3	–	2	–	0	6	–	5	–	0
Kent State	2	–	3	–	0	7	–	4	–	0
Bowling Green	2	–	3	–	0	6	–	4	–	1
Western Michigan	0	–	5	–	0	3	–	8	–	0
$ – Conference champion; Rankings from AP Poll

The 1974 Kent State Golden Flashes football team was an American football team that represented Kent State University in the Mid-American Conference (MAC) during the 1974 NCAA Division I football season. In their fourth and final season under head coach Don James, the Golden Flashes compiled a 7–4 record (2–3 against MAC opponents), finished in fourth place in the MAC, and outscored all opponents 254 to 161.

The team's statistical leaders included Larry Poole with 1,070 rushing yards, Greg Kokal with 1,265 passing yards, and Ken Dooner with 451 receiving yards. Six Kent State players were selected as first-team All-MAC players: defensive back Cedric Brown, tight end Ken Dooner, defensive end Marvin Elliott, defensive lineman Larry Faulk, running back Larry Poole, and center Henry Waszczuk.

After the season on December 23, James resigned and departed for the University of Washington in Seattle. He was credited with turning a "mediocre" Kent State program into a MAC power in four years; their 9–2 record in 1973 was the best in program history.

== Schedule ==
Date	Opponent	Site	Result	Attendance	Source
September 7	at Central Michigan*	Perry Shorts Stadium; Mount Pleasant, MI	W 21–14	16,825–18,325	
September 14	at Syracuse*	Archbold Stadium; Syracuse, NY	W 20–14	20,798	
September 21	Ohio	Dix Stadium; Kent, OH	L 0–20	15,267	
September 28	at Eastern Michigan*	Rynearson Stadium; Ypsilanti, MI	W 13–0	12,000	
October 5	Western Michigan	Dix Stadium; Kent, OH	W 28–6	11,357	
October 12	at Bowling Green	Doyt Perry Stadium; Bowling Green, OH (rivalry)	L 10–26	10,493	
October 19	Utah State*	Dix Stadium; Kent, OH	L 24–27	9,722	
October 26	Akron*	Dix Stadium; Kent, OH (Wagon Wheel)	W 51–14	15,200	
November 2	at Marshall*	Fairfield Stadium; Huntington, WV	W 35–7	9,121	
November 9	at No. 13 Miami (OH)	Miami Field; Oxford, OH	L 17–19	7,400	
November 16	Toledo	Dix Stadium; Kent, OH	W 35–14	7,400	
*Non-conference game; Rankings from AP Poll released prior to the game
