= 1974 Alcorn State Braves football team =

American college football season

1974 Alcorn State Braves football

Black college football national co-champion SWAC co-champion

NCAA Division II Quarterfinal, L 22–35 at UNLV
- Conference: Southwestern Athletic Conference

Ranking
- AP: No. 14
- Record: 9–2 (5–1 SWAC)
- Head coach: Marino Casem (11th season)
- Home stadium: Henderson Stadium

1974 Southwestern Athletic Conference football standings
	Conf.					Overall
Team	W		L		T	W		L		T
No. 7 Grambling State +	5	–	1	–	0	11	–	1	–	0
No. 14 Alcorn State +^	5	–	1	–	0	9	–	2	–	0
No. 10 Jackson State	4	–	2	–	0	7	–	3	–	0
No. 12 Southern	3	–	3	–	0	8	–	3	–	0
Texas Southern	3	–	3	–	0	6	–	4	–	0
Mississippi Valley State	1	–	5	–	0	5	–	5	–	0
Prairie View A&M	0	–	6	–	0	0	–	10	–	0
+ – Conference co-champions; ^ – NCAA Division II playoff participant; Rankings from AP small college poll for Grambling State and Alconrn State and NAIA Division I poll for Jackson State and Southern

The 1974 Alcorn State Braves football team was an American football team that represented Alcorn State University in the Southwestern Athletic Conference (SWAC) during 1974 NCAA Division II football season. In their 11th season under head coach Marino Casem, the Braves compiled an 9–2 record (5–1 against conference opponents), won the SWAC championship, and outscored opponents by a total of 282 to 161. Alcorn State advanced to the NCAA Division II Football Championship playoffs, where the lost to UNLV in the quarterfinals.

Alcorn State was recognized as the black college national champion and was ranked No. 14 in the final Associated Press small college rankings.

== Schedule ==
Date	Opponent	Rank	Site	Result	Attendance	Source
September 14	Arkansas–Pine Bluff*		Henderson Stadium; Lorman, MS	W 24–12	15,000	
September 21	at No. 5 Grambling State		Grambling Stadium; Grambling, LA	W 19–14	17,200–17,859	
September 28	North Carolina Central*		Henderson Stadium; Lorman, MS	W 14–12	14,600	
October 5	at South Carolina State*		State College Stadium; Orangeburg, SC	W 14–0	12,000	
October 12	Texas Southern		Henderson Stadium; Lorman, MS	W 37–34	19,000	
October 26	Southern	No. 12	Henderson Stadium; Lorman, MS	W 23–14	8,400–21,080	
November 2	Bishop*	No. 10	Henderson Stadium; Lorman, MS	W 38–0	19,460	
November 9	at Mississippi Valley State	No. 9	Magnolia Stadium; Itta Bena, MS	W 30–21	15,235	
November 16	at Prairie View A&M	No. 9	Edward L. Blackshear Field; Prairie View, TX	W 48–0	8,000	
November 23	Jackson State	No. 8	Henderson Stadium; Lorman, MS	L 13–19	18,000–24,000	
November 30	at No. 2 UNLV*	No. 12	Las Vegas Stadium; Whitney, NV (NCAA Division II Quarterfinal)	L 22–35	12,689	
*Non-conference game; Rankings from AP Poll released prior to the game
