= 1974 Morgan State Bears football team =

American college football season

1974 Morgan State Bears football
- Conference: Mid-Eastern Athletic Conference
- Record: 5–5 (4–2 MEAC)
- Head coach: Nat Taylor (1st season)
- Defensive coordinator: Thomas Morris (2nd season)
- Home stadium: Hughes Stadium

1974 Mid-Eastern Athletic Conference football standings
	Conf.					Overall
Team	W		L		T	W		L		T
No. 11 South Carolina State $	5	–	1	–	0	8	–	4	–	0
Howard	4	–	1	–	1	8	–	2	–	1
North Carolina Central	4	–	1	–	1	7	–	2	–	2
Morgan State	4	–	2	–	0	5	–	5	–	0
North Carolina A&T	2	–	4	–	0	5	–	6	–	0
Maryland Eastern Shore	1	–	5	–	0	2	–	6	–	0
Delaware State	0	–	6	–	0	3	–	6	–	0
$ – Conference champion; Rankings from NAIA Division I poll

The 1974 Morgan State Bears football team represented Morgan State College (now known as Morgan State University) as a member of the Mid-Eastern Athletic Conference (MEAC) during the 1974 NCAA Division II football season. Led by first-year head coach Nat Taylor, the Bears compiled an overall record of 5–5, with a mark of 4–2 in conference play, and finished fourth in the MEAC.

== Schedule ==
Date	Opponent	Site	Result	Attendance	Source
September 7	vs. Jackson State*	Veterans Stadium; Philadelphia, PA (OIC Classic)	W 10–6	20,500	
September 14	vs. Virginia State*	Dillon Stadium; Hartford, CT (Ujima Classic)	L 9–10	10,000	
September 28	vs. No. 14 Grambling State*	RFK Stadium; Washington, DC	L 0–14	32,000	
October 5	North Carolina Central	Hughes Stadium; Baltimore, MD	L 3–13	7,000	
October 12	at Maryland Eastern Shore	Princess Anne, MD	W 35–7	3,000–5,000	
October 19	South Carolina State	Hughes Stadium; Baltimore, MD	W 23–17	5,121	
October 26	Delaware State	Hughes Stadium; Baltimore, MD	W 21–7	10,000	
November 2	at North Carolina A&T	World War Memorial Stadium; Greensboro, NC	W 20–0	19,056–20,000	
November 9	Howard	Hughes Stadium; Baltimore, MD (rivalry)	L 7–30	9,800–10,000	
November 16	at Central State (OH)*	McPherson Stadium; Wilberforce, OH	L 7–46	10,000	
*Non-conference game; Rankings from Coaches' Poll released prior to the game
