= 1974 Howard Bison football team =

American college football season

1974 Howard Bison football

Orange Blossom Classic, L 13–17 vs. Florida A&M
- Conference: Mid-Eastern Athletic Conference
- Record: 8–2–1 (4–1–1 MEAC)
- Head coach: Doug Porter (1st season)
- Home stadium: RFK Stadium

1974 Mid-Eastern Athletic Conference football standings
	Conf.					Overall
Team	W		L		T	W		L		T
No. 11 South Carolina State $	5	–	1	–	0	8	–	4	–	0
Howard	4	–	1	–	1	8	–	2	–	1
North Carolina Central	4	–	1	–	1	7	–	2	–	2
Morgan State	4	–	2	–	0	5	–	5	–	0
North Carolina A&T	2	–	4	–	0	5	–	6	–	0
Maryland Eastern Shore	1	–	5	–	0	2	–	6	–	0
Delaware State	0	–	6	–	0	3	–	6	–	0
$ – Conference champion; Rankings from NAIA Division I poll

The 1974 Howard Bison football team represented Howard University as a member of the Mid-Eastern Athletic Conference (MEAC) during the 1974 NCAA Division II football season. Led by first-year head coach Doug Porter, the Bison compiled an overall record of 8–2–1, with a mark of 4–1–1 in conference play, and finished tied for second in the MEAC.

== Schedule ==
Date	Opponent	Site	Result	Attendance	Source
September 14	Morris Brown*	RFK Stadium; Washington, DC	W 30–0	5,215	
September 21	at Maryland Eastern Shore	Princess Anne, MD	W 31–7	2,112–3,000	
September 27	South Carolina State	RFK Stadium; Washington, DC	L 0–6	8,324–13,357	
October 5	at Virginia State*	Rogers Stadium; Ettrick, VA	W 31–7	4,116	
October 11	Delaware State	RFK Stadium; Washington, DC	W 30–7	5,872	
October 19	at West Virginia State*	Dickerson Stadium; Institute, WV	W 48–0	5,500	
October 26	North Carolina A&T^{†}	RFK Stadium; Washington, DC	W 13–9	19,697	
November 2	at Hampton*	Armstrong Stadium; Hampton, VA (rivalry)	W 27–12	9,744	
November 9	at Morgan State	Hughes Stadium; Baltimore, MD (rivalry)	W 30–7	9,800–10,000	
November 15	North Carolina Central	RFK Stadium; Washington, DC	T 17–17	8,700	
December 7	vs. Florida A&M*	Miami Orange Bowl; Miami, FL (Orange Blossom Classic)	L 13–17	21,167	
*Non-conference game; ^{†}Homecoming
