= 1974 North Carolina Central Eagles football team =

American college football season

1974 North Carolina Central Eagles football
- Conference: Mid-Eastern Athletic Conference
- Record: 7–2–2 (4–1–1 MEAC)
- Head coach: Willie Smith (2nd season)
- Home stadium: Durham County Memorial Stadium

1974 Mid-Eastern Athletic Conference football standings
	Conf.					Overall
Team	W		L		T	W		L		T
No. 11 South Carolina State $	5	–	1	–	0	8	–	4	–	0
Howard	4	–	1	–	1	8	–	2	–	1
North Carolina Central	4	–	1	–	1	7	–	2	–	2
Morgan State	4	–	2	–	0	5	–	5	–	0
North Carolina A&T	2	–	4	–	0	5	–	6	–	0
Maryland Eastern Shore	1	–	5	–	0	2	–	6	–	0
Delaware State	0	–	6	–	0	3	–	6	–	0
$ – Conference champion; Rankings from NAIA Division I poll

The 1974 North Carolina Central Eagles football team represented North Carolina Central University as a member of the Mid-Eastern Athletic Conference (MEAC) during the 1974 NCAA Division II football season. Led by second-year head coach Willie Smith, the Eagles compiled an overall record of 7–2–2, with a mark of 4–1–1 in conference play, and finished tied for second in the MEAC.

It was their final season at the Durham County Memorial Stadium, which would be replaced by the brand new O'Kelly–Riddick Stadium for the following season.

== Schedule ==
Date	Opponent	Site	Result	Attendance	Source
September 14	at Savannah State*	Ted Wright Stadium; Savannah, GA	T 0–0		
September 21	Winston-Salem State*	Durham County Memorial Stadium; Durham, NC	W 27–7		
September 28	at Alcorn State*	Henderson Stadium; Lorman, MS	L 12–14	14,600	
October 5	at Morgan State	Hughes Stadium; Baltimore, MD	W 13–3	7,000	
October 12	Virginia State*	Durham County Memorial Stadium; Durham, NC	W 14–3		
October 19	at Delaware State	Alumni Stadium; Dover, DE	W 7–0		
October 26	Maryland Eastern Shore^{†}	Durham County Memorial Stadium; Durham, NC	W 16–7	12,500–16,000	
November 2	at South Carolina State	State College Stadium; Orangeburg, SC	L 3–21	4,031	
November 9	Johnson C. Smith*	Durham County Memorial Stadium; Durham, NC	W 21–7		
November 15	at Howard	RFK Stadium; Washington, DC	T 17–17	8,700	
November 23	vs. North Carolina A&T	Wallace Wade Stadium; Durham, NC (rivalry)	W 29–18		
*Non-conference game; ^{†}Homecoming
