= 1974 Maryland Eastern Shore Hawks football team =

American college football season

1974 Maryland Eastern Shore Hawks football
- Conference: Mid-Eastern Athletic Conference
- Record: 2–6 (1–5 MEAC)
- Head coach: Harold Gray (2nd season)

1974 Mid-Eastern Athletic Conference football standings
	Conf.					Overall
Team	W		L		T	W		L		T
No. 11 South Carolina State $	5	–	1	–	0	8	–	4	–	0
Howard	4	–	1	–	1	8	–	2	–	1
North Carolina Central	4	–	1	–	1	7	–	2	–	2
Morgan State	4	–	2	–	0	5	–	5	–	0
North Carolina A&T	2	–	4	–	0	5	–	6	–	0
Maryland Eastern Shore	1	–	5	–	0	2	–	6	–	0
Delaware State	0	–	6	–	0	3	–	6	–	0
$ – Conference champion; Rankings from NAIA Division I poll

The 1974 Maryland Eastern Shore Hawks football team represented the University of Maryland Eastern Shore as a member of the Mid-Eastern Athletic Conference (MEAC) during the 1974 NCAA Division II football season. Led by second-year head coach Harold Gray, the Hawks compiled an overall record of 2–6, with a mark of 1–5 in conference play, and finished sixth in the MEAC.

== Schedule ==
Date	Opponent	Site	Result	Attendance	Source
September 14	at Johnson C. Smith*	American Legion Memorial Stadium; Charlotte, NC	W 10–7	7,000	
September 21	Howard	Princess Anne, MD	L 7–31	2,112–3,000	
September 28	at Kentucky State*	Alumni Field; Frankfort, KY	L 0–14	3,000	
October 12	Morgan State	Princess Anne, MD	L 7–35	3,000–5,000	
October 19	North Carolina A&T^{†}	Princess Anne, MD	L 6–20	3,000	
October 26	at North Carolina Central	Durham County Memorial Stadium; Durham, NC	L 7–16	12,500–16,000	
November 2	at Delaware State	Alumni Stadium; Dover, DE	W 36–0	4,000	
November 9	at South Carolina State	State College Stadium; Orangeburg, SC	L 6–10	12,543–15,000	
*Non-conference game; ^{†}Homecoming
