= 1974 Southern Jaguars football team =

American college football season

1974 Southern Jaguars football
- Conference: Southwestern Athletic Conference
- Record: 8–3 (3–3 SWAC)
- Head coach: Charles Bates (3rd season)
- Home stadium: University Stadium

1974 Southwestern Athletic Conference football standings
	Conf.					Overall
Team	W		L		T	W		L		T
No. 7 Grambling State +	5	–	1	–	0	11	–	1	–	0
No. 14 Alcorn State +^	5	–	1	–	0	9	–	2	–	0
No. 10 Jackson State	4	–	2	–	0	7	–	3	–	0
No. 12 Southern	3	–	3	–	0	8	–	3	–	0
Texas Southern	3	–	3	–	0	6	–	4	–	0
Mississippi Valley State	1	–	5	–	0	5	–	5	–	0
Prairie View A&M	0	–	6	–	0	0	–	10	–	0
+ – Conference co-champions; ^ – NCAA Division II playoff participant; Rankings from AP small college poll for Grambling State and Alconrn State and NAIA Division I poll for Jackson State and Southern

The 1974 Southern Jaguars football team was an American football team that represented Southern University as a member of the Southwestern Athletic Conference (SWAC) during the 1974 NCAA Division II football season. Led by Charles Bates in his third season as head coach, the Jaguars compiled an overall record of 8–3 and a mark of 3–3 in conference play, placing fourth in the SWAC.

== Schedule ==
Date	Opponent	Site	Result	Attendance	Source
September 14	at Tuskegee*	Cramton Bowl; Montgomery, AL	W 33–22	20,000	
September 21	at Texas Southern	Jeppesen Stadium; Houston, TX	L 6–14	22,000	
September 28	Prairie View A&M	University Stadium; Baton Rouge, LA	W 34–7	16,000	
October 5	at Mississippi Valley State	Magnolia Stadium; Itta Bena, MS	W 21–17	8,500	
October 12	at Arkansas–Pine Bluff*	Pumphrey Stadium; Pine Bluff, AR	W 48–7	6,500	
October 19	Jackson State	University Stadium; Baton Rouge, LA (rivalry)	W 21–19	20,000	
October 26	at No. 12 Alcorn State	Henderson Stadium; Lorman, MS	L 14–23	8,400–21,080	
November 2	at Nebraska–Omaha*	Al F. Caniglia Field; Omaha, NE	W 21–7	2,500	
November 9	at Cal State Los Angeles*	Campus Stadium; Los Angeles, CA	W 42–8	10,000–10,079	
November 16	Florida A&M*	University Stadium; Baton Rouge, LA	W 24–8	16,000	
November 23	vs. No. 7 Grambling State	Tulane Stadium; New Orleans, LA (Bayou Classic)	L 0–21	76,700–76,753	
*Non-conference game; Rankings from AP Poll released prior to the game
