= 1974 Texas A&I Javelinas football team =

American college football season

1974 Texas A&I Javelinas football

NAIA Division I national champion LSC champion

Champion Bowl, W 34–23 vs. Henderson State
- Conference: Lone Star Conference
- Record: 13–0 (8–0 LSC)
- Head coach: Gil Steinke (21st season)
- Defensive coordinator: Fred Jonas (6th season)
- Captains: Charles Bishop; Ray Evans; David Hill
- Home stadium: Javelina Stadium

1974 Lone Star Conference football standings
	Conf.					Overall
Team	W		L		T	W		L		T
No. 1/3 Texas A&I $^	9	–	0	–	0	13	–	0	–	0
No. 5 Stephen F. Austin	7	–	2	–	0	9	–	2	–	0
Abilene Christian	6	–	3	–	0	7	–	4	–	0
Southwest Texas State	6	–	3	–	0	6	–	4	–	0
East Texas State	5	–	4	–	0	7	–	4	–	0
Howard Payne	4	–	5	–	0	5	–	6	–	0
Sam Houston State	4	–	5	–	0	4	–	7	–	0
Angelo State	3	–	4	–	0	4	–	6	–	0
Sul Ross	1	–	8	–	0	1	–	9	–	0
Tarleton State	0	–	9	–	0	1	–	10	–	0
$ – Conference champion; ^ – NAIA Division I playoff participant; Rankings from NAIA Division I poll and AP small college poll

The 1974 Texas A&I Javelinas football team was an American football team that represented the Texas College of Arts and Industries (now known as Texas A&M University–Kingsville) as a member of the Lone Star Conference during the 1974 NAIA Division I football season. In its 21st year under head coach Gil Steinke, the team compiled a perfect 13–0 record (8–0 against conference opponents), won the Lone Star Conference championship, and defeated Henderson State in the Champion Bowl to win the NAIA national championship.

The team played its home games at Javelina Stadium in Kingsville, Texas.

== Schedule ==
Date	Opponent	Rank	Site	Result	Attendance	Source
September 14	Jacksonville State*		Javelina Stadium; Kingsville, TX	W 20–19	10,000	
September 21	at Monterrey Tech*		Monterrey, Mexico	W 33–6		
September 28	Abilene Christian		Javelina Stadium; Kingsville, TX	W 46–14		
October 5	at Stephen F. Austin	No. 14	Lumberjack Stadium; Nacogdoches, TX	W 28–24	12,000	
October 12	at East Texas State	No. 10	Memorial Stadium; Commerce, TX	W 27–20		
October 19	Sul Ross	No. 6	Javelina Stadium; Kingsville, TX	W 43–13		
October 26	at Angelo State	No. 5	San Angelo, TX	W 42–14	9,000	
November 2	Tarleton State	No. 5	Javelina Stadium; Kingsville, TX	W 51–7		
November 9	Sam Houston State	No. 5	Javelina Stadium; Kingsville, TX	W 34–14	14,000	
November 16	at Howard Payne	No. 5	Brownwood, TX	W 42–19		
November 23	at Southwest Texas State	No. 6	Evans FieldSan Marcos, TX	W 14–0	5,500	
December 7	Cameron*	No. 5	Javelina Stadium; Kingsville, TX (NAIA Division I semifinal)	W 21–19	15,742	
December 14	Henderson State*	No. 5	Javelina Stadium; Kingsville, TX (NAIA Division championship game—Champion Bowl)	W 34–23	12,596	
*Non-conference game; Rankings from AP Poll released prior to the game
