= Carlos Pennywell =

American football player (born 1956)

No. 88
- Position: Wide receiver

Personal information
- Born: March 18, 1956 (age 70); Crowley, Louisiana, U.S.
- Listed height: 6 ft 2 in (1.88 m)
- Listed weight: 180 lb (82 kg)

Career information
- High school: Captain Shreve (Shreveport, Louisiana)
- College: Grambling State
- NFL draft: 1978: 3rd round, 77th overall pick

Career history
- New England Patriots (1978–1981)

Career NFL statistics
- Games played: 38
- Receptions: 12
- Receiving Yards: 143
- Touchdowns: 3
- Stats at Pro Football Reference

Carlos Jerome Pennywell (born March 18, 1956) is an American former professional football player who was a wide receiver in the National Football League (NFL). He played for the New England Patriots from 1978 to 1981. His cousin Robert Pennywell also played for the NFL.
