= Dwight Scales =

American football player (born 1953)

No. 87, 88, 84
- Position: Wide receiver

Personal information
- Born: May 30, 1953 (age 73); Little Rock, Arkansas, U.S.
- Listed height: 6 ft 2 in (1.88 m)
- Listed weight: 178 lb (81 kg)

Career information
- High school: Lee (AL)
- College: Grambling State
- NFL draft: 1976: 5th round, 155th overall pick

Career history
- Los Angeles Rams (1976–1978); New York Giants (1979); San Diego Chargers (1981–1983); Seattle Seahawks (1984)

Career NFL statistics
- Receptions: 56
- Receiving yards: 1,120
- Receiving TDs: 4
- Stats at Pro Football Reference

Dwight Scales (born May 30, 1953) is an American former professional football player who was a wide receiver for eight seasons in the National Football League (NFL). He played college football for the Grambling State Tigers and was selected by the Los Angeles Rams in the fifth round of 1976 NFL draft. He also played for the New York Giants and San Diego Chargers before reuniting with his former Rams' coach, Chuck Knox, on the Seattle Seahawks.

After his playing career ended, he worked as the offensive coordinator at St. Michael's Catholic Academy, a private Catholic high school in Austin, Texas from 1997 to 1999.

== Head coaching record ==
Year	Team	Overall	Conference	Standing	Bowl/playoffs
Morehouse Maroon Tigers (Southern Intercollegiate Athletic Conference) (1990)
1990	Morehouse	1–7–1	1–6	7th	
Morehouse:		1–7–1	1–6		
Total:		1–7–1			
