= 1974 NCAA Division II football season =

American college football season

- Regular season: September – November 1974
- Playoffs: November – December 1974
- National Championship: Hughes Stadium; Sacramento, CA
- Champion: Central Michigan

The 1974 NCAA Division II football season, part of college football in the United States organized by the National Collegiate Athletic Association at the Division II level, began in September and concluded with the Division II Championship on December 14 at Hughes Stadium in Sacramento, California.

Central Michigan defeated Delaware 54–15 in the Camellia Bowl to win their only Division II national title. CMU moved up to Division I in 1975.

== Conference standings ==
1974 Big Sky Conference football standings
	Conf.					Overall
Team	W		L		T	W		L		T
No. 5 Boise State $^	6	–	0	–	0	10	–	2	–	0
Montana State	4	–	2	–	0	7	–	3	–	0
Idaho	2	–	2	–	1	2	–	8	–	1
Montana	2	–	3	–	1	3	–	6	–	1
Northern Arizona	2	–	3	–	0	3	–	6	–	0
Idaho State	2	–	4	–	0	5	–	5	–	0
Weber State	1	–	5	–	0	4	–	7	–	0
$ – Conference champion; ^ – NCAA Division II playoff participant; Rankings from AP small college poll

1974 California Collegiate Athletic Association football standings
	Conf.					Overall
Team	W		L		T	W		L		T
UC Riverside $	4	–	0	–	0	8	–	3	–	0
Cal Poly	2	–	1	–	1	5	–	4	–	1
Cal Poly Pomona	1	–	1	–	2	5	–	3	–	2
Cal State Northridge	1	–	3	–	0	2	–	9	–	0
Cal State Los Angeles	0	–	3	–	1	5	–	4	–	1
$ – Conference champion

1974 Central Intercollegiate Athletic Association football standings
	Conf.					Overall
Team	W		L		T	W		L		T
Norfolk State $	8	–	0	–	0	8	–	2	–	0
Virginia Union	7	–	1	–	0	8	–	2	–	0
Livingstone	5	–	1	–	0	8	–	3	–	0
Johnson C. Smith	4	–	2	–	0	4	–	7	–	0
Hampton	3	–	4	–	0	3	–	7	–	0
Elizabeth City State	3	–	5	–	0	3	–	7	–	0
Winston-Salem State	3	–	5	–	0	4	–	7	–	0
Virginia State	2	–	4	–	0	3	–	7	–	0
Shaw	2	–	5	–	0	4	–	6	–	0
Fayetteville State	2	–	6	–	0	4	–	7	–	0
Saint Paul's (VA)	0	–	6	–	0	1	–	8	–	0
$ – Conference champion

1974 Eastern Football Conference football standings
	Conf.					Overall
Team	W		L		T	W		L		T
Central Connecticut State $	3	–	0	–	0	4	–	5	–	1
Glassboro State	2	–	1	–	0	6	–	3	–	1
Montclair State	1	–	2	–	0	6	–	3	–	1
Southern Connecticut State	0	–	3	–	0	4	–	5	–	0
$ – Conference champion

1974 Far Western Conference football standings
	Conf.					Overall
Team	W		L		T	W		L		T
UC Davis $	5	–	0	–	0	9	–	1	–	0
San Francisco State	2	–	3	–	0	5	–	6	–	0
Humboldt State	2	–	3	–	0	4	–	6	–	0
Chico State	2	–	3	–	0	4	–	7	–	0
Cal State Hayward	2	–	3	–	0	3	–	6	–	0
Sacramento State	2	–	3	–	0	2	–	9	–	0
$ – Conference champion

1974 Gulf South Conference football standings
	Conf.					Overall
Team	W		L		T	W		L		T
No. 7 Jacksonville State $	7	–	1	–	0	7	–	4	–	0
Delta State	7	–	2	–	0	8	–	3	–	0
No. 8 Livingston	5	–	3	–	0	8	–	3	–	0
Southeastern Louisiana	5	–	3	–	0	6	–	4	–	0
Troy State	4	–	4	–	0	6	–	4	–	0
North Alabama	4	–	4	–	0	4	–	6	–	0
Nicholls State	4	–	5	–	0	5	–	6	–	0
Northwestern State	1	–	6	–	0	1	–	10	–	0
Tennessee–Martin	1	–	7	–	0	2	–	9	–	0
Mississippi College	0	–	7	–	0	2	–	9	–	0
$ – Conference champion; Rankings from NAIA Division I poll

1974 Indiana Collegiate Conference football standings
	Conf.					Overall
Team	W		L		T	W		L		T
Butler $	6	–	0	–	0	8	–	2	–	0
Evansville ^	5	–	1	–	0	8	–	2	–	0
DePauw	4	–	2	–	0	7	–	3	–	0
Indiana Central	2	–	4	–	0	5	–	5	–	0
Wabash	2	–	4	–	0	5	–	5	–	0
Valparaiso	2	–	4	–	0	3	–	6	–	0
Saint Joseph's (IN)	0	–	6	–	0	0	–	9	–	0
$ – Conference champion; ^ – NCAA Division III playoff participant

1974 Mid-Eastern Athletic Conference football standings
	Conf.					Overall
Team	W		L		T	W		L		T
No. 11 South Carolina State $	5	–	1	–	0	8	–	4	–	0
Howard	4	–	1	–	1	8	–	2	–	1
North Carolina Central	4	–	1	–	1	7	–	2	–	2
Morgan State	4	–	2	–	0	5	–	5	–	0
North Carolina A&T	2	–	4	–	0	5	–	6	–	0
Maryland Eastern Shore	1	–	5	–	0	2	–	6	–	0
Delaware State	0	–	6	–	0	3	–	6	–	0
$ – Conference champion; Rankings from NAIA Division I poll

1974 Missouri Intercollegiate Athletic Association football standings
	Conf.					Overall
Team	W		L		T	W		L		T
NW Missouri State $	5	–	1	–	0	8	–	2	–	0
Missouri–Rolla	4	–	1	–	1	6	–	4	–	1
SW Missouri State	4	–	2	–	0	7	–	3	–	0
SE Missouri State	4	–	2	–	0	7	–	4	–	0
NE Missouri State	2	–	4	–	0	4	–	7	–	0
Central Missouri State	1	–	4	–	1	3	–	7	–	1
Lincoln (MO) *	0	–	6	–	0	3	–	8	–	0
$ – Conference champion; Lincoln's overall record includes a forfeit from Arkansas–Pine Bluff.

1974 North Central Conference football standings
	Conf.					Overall
Team	W		L		T	W		L		T
South Dakota +	5	–	2	–	0	8	–	3	–	0
North Dakota State +	5	–	2	–	0	7	–	4	–	0
North Dakota +	5	–	2	–	0	6	–	4	–	0
South Dakota State	4	–	3	–	0	6	–	5	–	0
Mankato State	3	–	3	–	1	5	–	4	–	1
Northern Iowa	3	–	3	–	1	5	–	4	–	1
Augustana (SD)	2	–	5	–	0	4	–	6	–	0
Morningside	0	–	7	–	0	0	–	9	–	0
+ – Conference co-champions

1974 Northern Intercollegiate Conference football standings
	Conf.					Overall
Team	W		L		T	W		L		T
Michigan Tech $	6	–	0	–	0	9	–	0	–	0
St. Cloud State	5	–	1	–	0	5	–	5	–	0
Winona State	3	–	3	–	0	5	–	4	–	0
Moorhead State	3	–	3	–	0	4	–	5	–	0
Southwest State (MN)	2	–	4	–	0	4	–	5	–	0
Minnesota Morris	2	–	4	–	0	3	–	7	–	0
Bemidji State	0	–	6	–	0	2	–	7	–	0
$ – Conference champion

1974 Ohio Valley Conference football standings
	Conf.					Overall
Team	W		L		T	W		L		T
Eastern Kentucky $	6	–	1	–	0	8	–	2	–	0
Murray State	5	–	2	–	0	9	–	2	–	0
Western Kentucky	5	–	2	–	0	7	–	3	–	0
Tennessee Tech	4	–	3	–	0	6	–	5	–	0
East Tennessee State	3	–	3	–	1	4	–	6	–	1
Middle Tennessee	2	–	5	–	0	3	–	8	–	0
Austin Peay	1	–	5	–	1	3	–	7	–	1
Morehead State	1	–	6	–	0	3	–	8	–	0
$ – Conference champion

1974 Pennsylvania State Athletic Conference football standings
	Conf.					Overall
Team	W		L		T	W		L		T
East Division
West Chester xy	5	–	0	–	0	8	–	2	–	0
No. 6 Millersville	5	–	1	–	0	8	–	1	–	0
East Stroudsburg	4	–	2	–	0	5	–	5	–	0
Kutztown	3	–	3	–	0	4	–	5	–	0
Cheyney	2	–	4	–	0	5	–	4	–	0
Mansfield	0	–	4	–	1	1	–	7	–	1
Bloomsburg	0	–	5	–	1	1	–	7	–	1
West Division
No. 13 Slippery Rock xy$^	5	–	0	–	1	9	–	1	–	1
Clarion	4	–	1	–	1	6	–	2	–	1
Indiana (PA)	4	–	2	–	0	6	–	4	–	0
Shippensburg	3	–	3	–	0	6	–	4	–	0
Edinboro	2	–	2	–	2	5	–	2	–	2
California (PA)	1	–	5	–	0	1	–	7	–	0
Lock Haven	0	–	6	–	0	1	–	8	–	0
Championship: Slippery Rock 20, West Chester 7
$ – Conference champion; x – Division champion/co-champions; y – Championship game participant; ^ – NCAA Division III playoff participant; Rankings from AP small college poll for Slippery Rock and NAIA Division I poll for Millersville

1974 Southern Intercollegiate Athletic Conference football standings
	Conf.					Overall
Team	W		L		T	W		L		T
Division I
Tuskegee x	5	–	0	–	0	10	–	1	–	0
Bethune–Cookman	4	–	1	–	0	8	–	3	–	1
Florida A&M	3	–	2	–	0	6	–	5	–	0
Alabama State	2	–	3	–	0	2	–	8	–	0
Alabama A&M	1	–	4	–	0	4	–	7	–	0
Albany State	1	–	4	–	0	3	–	7	–	0
Morris Brown	1	–	4	–	0	2	–	8	–	0
Division II
Clark (GA) x	5	–	0	–	0	8	–	1	–	0
Fisk	4	–	1	–	0	5	–	4	–	0
Fort Valley State	3	–	2	–	0	5	–	3	–	0
Savannah State	3	–	2	–	0	3	–	6	–	1
Knoxville	2	–	3	–	0	7	–	4	–	0
Miles	2	–	3	–	0	3	–	6	–	0
Morehouse	1	–	4	–	0	2	–	7	–	0
Lane	0	–	5	–	0	0	–	8	–	0
x – Division champion/co-champions

1974 Southland Conference football standings
	Conf.					Overall
Team	W		L		T	W		L		T
No. 2 Louisiana Tech $^	5	–	0	–	0	11	–	1	–	0
Lamar	4	–	1	–	0	8	–	2	–	0
Arkansas State	3	–	2	–	0	7	–	3	–	0
McNeese State	2	–	3	–	0	6	–	4	–	1
UT Arlington	1	–	4	–	0	1	–	10	–	0
SW Louisiana	0	–	5	–	0	2	–	9	–	0
$ – Conference champion; ^ – NCAA Division II playoff participant; Rankings from AP small college poll

1974 Southwestern Athletic Conference football standings
	Conf.					Overall
Team	W		L		T	W		L		T
No. 7 Grambling State +	5	–	1	–	0	11	–	1	–	0
No. 14 Alcorn State +^	5	–	1	–	0	9	–	2	–	0
No. 10 Jackson State	4	–	2	–	0	7	–	3	–	0
No. 12 Southern	3	–	3	–	0	8	–	3	–	0
Texas Southern	3	–	3	–	0	6	–	4	–	0
Mississippi Valley State	1	–	5	–	0	5	–	5	–	0
Prairie View A&M	0	–	6	–	0	0	–	10	–	0
+ – Conference co-champions; ^ – NCAA Division II playoff participant; Rankings from AP small college poll for Grambling State and Alconrn State and NAIA Division I poll for Jackson State and Southern

1974 Virginia College Athletic Association football standings
	Conf.					Overall
Team	W		L		T	W		L		T
Virginia Union	2	–	0	–	0	8	–	2	–	0
Randolph–Macon	4	–	0	–	1	6	–	2	–	1
Hampden–Sydney	4	–	1	–	0	6	–	4	–	0
Virginia State	2	–	1	–	0	3	–	7	–	0
Madison	3	–	2	–	0	6	–	4	–	0
Hampton	1	–	2	–	0	3	–	7	–	0
Bridgewater	1	–	3	–	0	4	–	5	–	0
Washington and Lee	0	–	2	–	1	1	–	8	–	1
Emory & Henry	0	–	3	–	0	3	–	8	–	0
Saint Paul's (VA)	0	–	3	–	0	1	–	8	–	0

1974 West Virginia Intercollegiate Athletic Conference football standings
	Conf.					Overall
Team	W		L		T	W		L		T
Northern Division
Fairmont State xy$	4	–	0	–	0	7	–	4	–	0
No. 15 Salem	3	–	1	–	0	7	–	2	–	0
West Liberty State	2	–	2	–	0	5	–	4	–	0
Shepherd	1	–	2	–	0	2	–	9	–	0
West Virginia Wesleyan	0	–	4	–	0	1	–	8	–	0
Southern Division
Concord xy	3	–	1	–	0	6	–	5	–	0
Bluefield State	3	–	1	–	0	5	–	4	–	0
Glenville State	3	–	1	–	0	5	–	4	–	0
West Virginia Tech	1	–	3	–	0	5	–	4	–	0
West Virginia State	0	–	4	–	0	1	–	8	–	0
Championship: Fairmont State 30, Concord 6
$ – Conference champion; x – Division champion/co-champions; y – Championship game participant; Conference standings based on power ratings; Rankings from NAIA Division I poll

1974 Yankee Conference football standings
	Conf.					Overall
Team	W		L		T	W		L		T
UMass +	4	–	2	–	0	5	–	6	–	0
Maine +	4	–	2	–	0	4	–	6	–	0
New Hampshire	3	–	3	–	0	5	–	4	–	0
Rhode Island	3	–	3	–	0	5	–	5	–	0
Boston University	3	–	3	–	0	5	–	4	–	1
Connecticut	3	–	3	–	0	4	–	6	–	0
Vermont	1	–	5	–	0	4	–	6	–	0
+ – Conference co-champions

1974 NCAA Division II independents football records
	Conf.			Overall
Team	W	L	T	W		L		T
No. 1 Central Michigan ^		–		12	–	1	–	0
No. 6 UNLV ^		–		12	–	1	–	0
No. 4 Delaware ^		–		12	–	2	–	0
No. 8 Western Carolina ^		–		9	–	2	–	0
No. 9 Tennessee State		–		8	–	2	–	0
No. 12 Youngstown State ^		–		8	–	2	–	0
Santa Clara		–		7	–	3	–	0
Wayne State (MI)		–		7	–	3	–	0
Ball State		–		6	–	4	–	0
Kentucky State		–		6	–	4	–	0
Northeastern		–		6	–	4	–	0
Central State (OH)		–		6	–	5	–	0
Akron		–		5	–	5	–	0
Indiana State		–		5	–	5	–	0
Nevada		–		5	–	6	–	0
Portland State		–		5	–	6	–	0
American International		–		4	–	5	–	0
Eastern Michigan		–		4	–	6	–	1
Milwaukee		–		4	–	6	–	0
Northeast Louisiana		–		4	–	6	–	0
Eastern Illinois		–		3	–	6	–	1
Arkansas–Pine Bluff		–		3	–	5	–	0
Chattanooga		–		4	–	7	–	0
Nebraska–Omaha		–		3	–	7	–	0
Bucknell		–		2	–	8	–	0
Northern Michigan		–		0	–	10	–	0
^ – NCAA Division II playoff participant; Rankings from AP small college poll

== Conference summaries ==
Conference	Champion(s)
Big Sky Conference	Boise State
Central Intercollegiate Athletic Association	Norfolk State
Far Western Football Conference	UC Davis
Gulf South Conference	Jacksonville State
Indiana Collegiate Conference	Butler
Missouri Intercollegiate Athletic Association	Northwest Missouri State
North Central Conference	North Dakota State, North Dakota, and South Dakota
Southern Intercollegiate Athletic Conference (Division II)	Tuskegee
Yankee Conference	Maine and Massachusetts

== Postseason ==
1974 NCAA Division II Football Championship
- Teams: 8
- Finals Site: Hughes Stadium; Sacramento, California
- Champion: Central Michigan; (1st title, 1st title game)
- Runner-up: Delaware; (1st title game)
- Semifinalists: Louisiana Tech; UNLV
- Winning coach: Roy Kramer; 1st championship

The 1974 NCAA Division II Football Championship playoffs were the second single-elimination tournament to determine the national champion of NCAA Division II college football.

The four quarterfinal games were played on campus and all four host teams advanced. The semifinals were the Pioneer Bowl in Wichita Falls, Texas, and the Grantland Rice Bowl in Baton Rouge, Louisiana. The championship game was the Camellia Bowl, held at Hughes Stadium in Sacramento, California for the second consecutive year. The Central Michigan Chippewas defeated the Delaware Fightin' Blue Hens 54–14 to win their first national title. After opening with a home loss to Division I Kent State, CMU won twelve straight to finish as D-II champions.

=== Playoff bracket ===
First round Campus sites November 30
Central Michigan *	20
Boise State	6
Louisiana Tech *	10
Western Carolina	7
UNLV *	35
Alcorn State	22
Delaware *	35
Youngstown State	14

Semifinals; Pioneer Bowl; Grantland Rice Bowl; December 7
Central Michigan	35
Louisiana Tech	14
UNLV	11
Delaware	49

Championship; Camellia Bowl; Hughes Stadium; Sacramento, CA; December 14
Central Michigan	54
Delaware	14

* Denotes host institution

== Rankings ==
In 1974, United Press International (UPI) and the Associated Press (AP) ranked teams in their College Division or "small college" polls – which had started in 1958 and 1960, respectively – for the final time. UPI published their final poll at the end of the regular season, while the AP waited until postseason games had been completed. UPI's number one selection was the Louisiana Tech Bulldogs, who during the regular season were 10–0 while outscoring opponents 294–103. The Bulldogs later lost in the playoffs to the Central Michigan Chippewas, winners of the tournament. AP's number one selection was the Chippewas, who were 9–1 during the regular season and finished with an overall record of 12–1 while outscoring opponents 450–127.

United Press International (coaches) final poll
Published on November 27

Rank	School	Record	No. 1 votes	Total points
1	Louisiana Tech	10–0	27	322
2	UNLV	11–0	5	254
3	Boise State	10–1	1	188
4	Delaware	10–1		168
5	Texas A&I	11–0		132
6	Grambling State	10–1		124
7	Central Michigan	9–1		101
8	Youngstown State	8–1		40
9	Tennessee State	8–2		38
10	Western Carolina	9–1		34
11	Stephen F. Austin	9–2		34
12	Slippery Rock	9–0–1		19
13	Alcorn State	9–1		17
14	Elon	10–1		10
15	South Dakota	8–3		9

Associated Press (writers) final poll
Published on December 24

Rank	School	Record	No. 1 votes	Total points
1	Central Michigan	12–1^{D2}	32	658
2	Louisiana Tech	10–1^{E1}^{D2}		477
3	Texas A&I	13–0^{N1}	2	461
4	Delaware	12–2^{D2}		460
5	Boise State	10–2^{D2}		401
6	UNLV	12–1^{D2}		381
7	Grambling State	11–1^{P}		322
8	Western Carolina	9–1^{E2}^{D2}		241
9	Tennessee State	8–2		180
10	Texas Lutheran	11–0^{N2}		171
11	Henderson State	11–2^{N1}		135
12	Youngstown State	8–2^{D2}		118
13	Slippery Rock	9–1–1^{D3}		90
14	Alcorn State	9–2^{D2}		87
15	Elon	10–2^{N1}		85

^D2 Record includes NCAA Division II playoff games
^D3 Record includes NCAA Division III playoff games ^E1 Louisiana Tech final record actually 11–1 ^E2 Western Carolina final record actually 9–2
^N1 Record includes NAIA Division I playoff games
^N2 Record includes NAIA Division II playoff games
^P Record includes Pelican Bowl win

== See also ==
- 1974 NCAA Division I football season
- 1974 NCAA Division III football season
- 1974 NAIA Division I football season
- 1974 NAIA Division II football season
