= 1974 small college football rankings =

- Selectors: AP, UPI
- No. 1: Central Michigan (AP)
- No. 1: Louisiana Tech (UPI)
- Small college football rankings (AP, UPI)
- «1973

The 1974 small college football rankings were conducted via polls of head football coaches by United Press International (UPI) and via polls of sportswriters and broadcasters by the Associated Press (AP).

The final UPI poll was released before the NCAA Division II playoffs, and ranked Louisiana Tech first. The AP poll was released after the playoffs and ranked Central Michigan first.

The 1974 NCAA Division II football season was the 17th year UPI published a small-college poll and it was the 15th year the Associated Press published their small-college poll. These "small college" polls were discontinued after this season.

== Legend ==
	Increase in ranking
	Decrease in ranking
	Not ranked previous week
(#–#)	Win–loss record
(Italics)	Number of first place votes
т	Tied with team above or below also with this symbol

== AP poll ==
	Week 1 Sept 18	Week 2 Sept 25	Week 3 Oct 2	Week 4 Oct 9	Week 5 Oct 16	Week 6 Oct 23	Week 7 Oct 30	Week 8 Nov 6	Week 9 Nov 13	Week 10 Nov 20	Week 11 Nov 27	Week Postseason	
1.	Western Kentucky (1–0) (9)	Louisiana Tech (2–0) (23)	Louisiana Tech (3–0) (22)	Louisiana Tech (3–0) (22)	Louisiana Tech (4–0) (17)	Louisiana Tech (6–0) (30)	Louisiana Tech (7–0) (35)	Louisiana Tech (8–0) (27)	Louisiana Tech (8–0) (27)	Louisiana Tech (9–0) (23)	Louisiana Tech (10–0) (21)	Central Michigan (12–1)	1.
2.	Louisiana Tech (1–0) (7)	Western Kentucky (1–0) (11)	Western Kentucky (2–0) (7)	Delaware (4–0) (5)	Western Kentucky (4–0) (9)	Delaware (6–0) (4)	UNLV (7–0) (5)	UNLV (8–0) (5)	UNLV (9–0) (4)	UNLV (10–0) (4)	UNLV (11–0) (4)	Louisiana Tech (10–1)	2.
3.	Boise State (1–0) (5)	Boise State (2–0) (6)	Delaware (3–0) (4)	Western Kentucky (3–0) (5)	Delaware (5–0) (6)	UNLV (6–0) (2)	Delaware (6–1) (3)	Delaware (7–1) (3)	Delaware (8–1) (2)	Delaware (9–1) (2)	Delaware (10–1) (4)	Texas A&I (13–0)	3.
4.	Delaware (1–0) (3)	Delaware (2–0) (3)	Boise State (3–0) (3)	Boise State (4–0) (2)	Boise State (5–0) (4)	Boise State (5–1)	Boise State (6–1)	Boise State (7–1)	Boise State (8–1) (1)	Boise State (9–1)	Boise State (10–1)	Delaware (12–2)	4.
5.	Grambling State (1–0)	McNeese State (2–0) (1)	McNeese State (3–0) (1)	Tennessee State (3–1)	UNLV (5–0)	Texas A&I (6–0) (1)	Texas A&I (7–0) (1)	Texas A&I (8–0) (1)	Texas A&I (9–0) (1)	Central Michigan (9–1) (1)	Texas A&I (11–0) (2)	Boise State (10–2)	5.
6.	Abilene Christian (1–0) (2)	Abilene Christian (2–0) (1)	Tennessee State (3–1)	UNLV (4–0)	Texas A&I (5–0) (1)	Grambling State (5–1)	Grambling State (6–1)	Grambling State (7–1)	Grambling State (8–1)	Texas A&I (10–0) (2)	Central Michigan (9–1) (2)	UNLV (12–1)	6.
7.	Tennessee State (1–1) (4)	UNLV (2–0)	Troy State (4–0) (1)	Indiana State (4–0)	Grambling State (4–1)	Western Kentucky (4–1)	Western Kentucky (5–1)	Western Kentucky (6–1)	Central Michigan (8–1) (2)	Grambling State (9–1)	Grambling State (10–1)	Grambling State (11–1)	7.
8.	McNeese State (1–0) (1)	Tennessee State (2–1)	UNLV (3–0)	North Dakota (3–1) (1)	Elon (5–0)	Central Michigan (5–1) (1)	Central Michigan (6–1) (2)	Central Michigan (6–1) (3)	Western Kentucky (7–1)	Alcorn State (9–0)	Western Carolina (9–1) (1)	Western Carolina (9–1)	8.
9.	Troy State (2–0)	Troy State (3–0) (1)	Indiana State (3–0)	McNeese State (3–1)	Stephen F. Austin (4–1)	South Dakota (6–1)	South Dakota (7–1)	Alcorn State (7–0)	Alcorn State (8–0)	Western Carolina (8–1) (1)	Slippery Rock (9–0–1)	Tennessee State (8–2)	9.
10.	UNLV (1–0) (Note: In the actual printed polls, UNLV was listed as Nevada Las Vegas)	Indiana State (2–0) т	North Dakota (2–1) (1)	Texas A&I (4–0) (1)	McNeese State (3–1–1)	McNeese State (4–1–1)	Alcorn State (6–0)	Western Carolina (6–1) (1)	McNeese State (6–2–1)	Tennessee State (8–2)	Tennessee State (8–2)	Texas Lutheran (11–0)	10.
11.	North Dakota (1–0)	North Dakota (1–1) т	Stephen F. Austin (3–0)	Elon (4–0)	Jacksonville State (3–1)	Stephen F. Austin (5–1)	Western Carolina (6–1) (1)	Tennessee State (6–2)	Western Carolina (7–1) (1)	Slippery Rock (8–0–1)	Youngstown State (8–1) (1)	Henderson State (11–2) (1)	11.
12.	Elon (1–0) (1)	Stephen F. Austin (2–0) т	Elon (3–0)	Grambling State (3–1)	Central Michigan (4–1)	Alcorn State (5–0)	McNeese State (4–2–1)	McNeese State (5–2–1)	Tennessee State (7–2)	Elon (9–1)	Alcorn State (9–1)	Youngstown State (8–2)	12.
13.	Stephen F. Austin (1–0)	Elon (2–0)	Grambling State (2–1)	Troy State (4–1)	South Dakota (5–1)	Tennessee State (4–2)	Tennessee State (5–2)	UC Davis (7–0)	Slippery Rock (8–0–1)	Western Kentucky (7–2)	Elon (10–1)	Slippery Rock (9–1–1)	13.
14.	Jacksonville State (0–1)	Grambling State (1–1)	Texas A&I (3–0)	Stephen F. Austin (3–1)	Tennessee State (3–2)	Western Carolina (5–1)	Elon (6–1)	Elon (7–1)	Elon (8–1)	Youngstown State (8–1)	Texas Lutheran (10–0)	Alcorn State (9–2)	14.
15.	Indiana State (1–0)	Jacksonville State (1–1)	Jacksonville State (2–1)	Jacksonville State (3–1)	Alcorn State (5–0) (Note: In the actual printed polls, Alcorn State was sometimes listed as Alcorn A&M)	Elon (5–1) т	UC Davis (6–0) (Note: In the actual printed polls, UC Davis was listed as California Davis)	South Dakota (7–2)	South Dakota (8–2)	McNeese State (6–3–1)	Eastern Kentucky (8–2)	Elon (10–2)	15.
16.						Eastern Kentucky (4–1) т							16.
	Week 1 Sept 18	Week 2 Sept 25	Week 3 Oct 2	Week 4 Oct 9	Week 5 Oct 16	Week 6 Oct 23	Week 7 Oct 30	Week 8 Nov 6	Week 9 Nov 13	Week 10 Nov 20	Week 11 Nov 27	Week Postseason	
		None	Dropped: 6 Abilene Christian	None	Dropped: 7 Indiana State; 8 North Dakota; 13 Troy State	Dropped: 11 Jacksonville State	Dropped: 11 Stephen F. Austin; 15 Eastern Kentucky	None	Dropped: 13 UC Davis	Dropped: 15 South Dakota	Dropped: 13 Western Kentucky; 15 McNeese State	Dropped: 15 Eastern Kentucky	

== UPI coaches poll ==
	Week Sept 18	Week 1 Sept 25	Week 2 Oct 2	Week 3 Oct 9	Week 4 Oct 16	Week 5 Oct 23	Week 6 Oct 30	Week 7 Nov 6	Week 8 Nov 13	Week 9 Nov 20	Week 10 Nov 27	
1.	Western Kentucky (1–0) (9)	Louisiana Tech (2–0) (9)	Louisiana Tech (3–0) (18)	Louisiana Tech (3–0) (19)	Louisiana Tech (4–0) (18)	Louisiana Tech (5–0) (19)	Louisiana Tech (6–0) (26)	Louisiana Tech (7–0) (27)	Louisiana Tech (8–0) (27)	Louisiana Tech (9–0) (22)	Louisiana Tech (10–0)	1.
2.	Louisiana Tech (1–0) (10)	Western Kentucky (1–0) (11)	Western Kentucky (2–0) (6)	Western Kentucky (3–0) (6)	Western Kentucky (4–0) (6)	UNLV (6–0) (5)	UNLV (7–0) (7)	UNLV (8–0) (5)	UNLV (9–0) (5)	UNLV (10–0) (4)	UNLV (11–0)	2.
3.	Boise State (1–0) (6)	Boise State (2–0) (5)	Boise State (3–0) (5)	Delaware (4–0) (4)	Delaware (5–0) (2)	Delaware (6–0) (1)	Boise State (6–1)	Boise State (7–1)	Boise State (8–1)	Boise State (9–1)	Boise State (10–1)	3.
4.	Grambling State (1–0) (1)	Delaware (2–0) (1)	Delaware (3–0) (1)	Boise State (4–0) (5)	Boise State (5–0) (5)	Boise State (5–1)	Delaware (6–1)	Delaware (7–1) (1)	Delaware (8–1) (1)	Delaware (9–1)	Delaware (10–1)	4.
5.	Delaware (1–0) (2)	Tennessee State (2–1) (3)	Tennessee State (3–1) (1)	UNLV (4–0)	UNLV (5–0)	Texas A&I (6–0)	Texas A&I (7–0)	Texas A&I (8–0)	Texas A&I (9–0)	Texas A&I (10–0)	Texas A&I (11–0)	5.
6.	Tennessee State (0–1) (4)	Abilene Christian (2–0)	Troy State (3–0) (1)	Tennessee State (3–1)	Grambling State (4–1)	Grambling State (5–1) (1)	Grambling State (6–1) (1)	Grambling State (7–1)	Grambling State (8–1)	Grambling State (9–1)	Grambling State (10–1)	6.
7.	Abilene Christian (0–1) (1)	Troy State (2–0) (1)	UNLV (3–0)	North Dakota (3–1)	Texas A&I (5–0)	Western Kentucky (4–1)	Western Kentucky (5–1)	Western Kentucky (6–1)	Western Kentucky (7–1)	Central Michigan (9–1)	Central Michigan (9–1)	7.
8.	Troy State (1–0)	UNLV (2–0)	McNeese State (3–0)	Indiana State (4–0)	South Dakota (5–1)	South Dakota (6–1)	South Dakota (7–1)	Central Michigan (7–1)	Central Michigan (8–1)	Alcorn State (9–0) (1)	Youngstown State (8–1)	8.
9.	North Dakota (1–0)	McNeese State (2–0)	North Dakota (2–1)	Troy State (4–1)	Elon (5–0)	McNeese State (4–1–1)	Tennessee State (5–2)	Tennessee State (6–2)	Alcorn State (8–0)	Youngstown State (8–1)	Tennessee State (8–2)	9.
10.	UNLV (1–0)	North Dakota (1–1)	Abilene Christian (2–1)	Abilene Christian (3–1)	Stephen F. Austin (4–1)	Tennessee State (4–2)	Central Michigan (6–1)	Alcorn State (7–0) (1)	Tennessee State (7–2)	Tennessee State (8–2)	Western Carolina (9–1)	10.
11.	Stephen F. Austin (1–0)	South Dakota (2–1)	South Dakota (3–1)	McNeese State (3–1)	McNeese State (3–1–1) т	North Dakota (4–2)	Alcorn State (6–0)	UC Davis (7–0)	South Dakota (8–2)	Western Carolina (8–1)	Stephen F. Austin (9–2)	11.
12.	Elon (0–0)	Elon (1–0)	Indiana State (3–0)	South Dakota (4–1)	Tennessee State (3–2) т	Stephen F. Austin (5–1)	UC Davis (6–1)	South Dakota (7–2)	Youngstown State (7–1) т	Stephen F. Austin (8–2)	Slippery Rock (9–0–1)	12.
13.	McNeese State (1–0)	Stephen F. Austin (2–0)	Elon (2–0)	Elon (4–0) т	Alcorn State (5–0)	Central Michigan (6–1)	Delta State (6–1)	North Dakota (4–3) (1)	Elon (8–1) т	Slippery Rock (8–0–1)	Alcorn State (9–1)	13.
14.	Cal Poly (0–1) (Note: In the actual printed polls, Cal Poly was listed as Cal Poly San Luis Obispo)	Grambling State (1–1)	Stephen F. Austin (3–0)	Grambling State (3–1) т	Jackson State (3–1)	Delta State (5–1) т	Elon (6–1)	McNeese State (5–2–1) т	Western Carolina (7–1) т	South Dakota (8–3) т	Elon (10–1)	14.
15.	South Dakota (1–0)	Lehigh (2–0)	Grambling State (2–1)	Texas A&I (4–0)	Troy State (4–2)	UC Davis (5–1) т	McNeese State (4–2–1)	Indiana State (5–3) т	Stephen F. Austin (7–2) т	Elon (9–1) т	South Dakota (8–3)	15.
	Week Sept 18	Week 1 Sept 25	Week 2 Oct 2	Week 3 Oct 9	Week 4 Oct 16	Week 5 Oct 23	Week 6 Oct 30	Week 7 Nov 6	Week 8 Nov 13	Week 9 Nov 20	Week 10 Nov 27	
		Dropped: 14 Cal Poly	Dropped: 15 Lehigh	Dropped: 14 Stephen F. Austin	Dropped: 7 North Dakota; 8 Indiana State; 10 Abilene Christian	Dropped: 9 Elon; 13 Alcorn State; 14 Jackson State; 15 Troy State	Dropped: 11 North Dakota; 12 Stephen F. Austin	Dropped: 13 Delta State; 14 Elon	Dropped: 11 UC Davis; 13 North Dakota; 14 McNeese State; 15 Indiana State	Dropped: 7 Western Kentucky	None	

== HBCU rankings ==
Jet magazine ranked the top 1974 teams from historically black colleges and universities based on a poll of coaches and conference commissioners.

The poll was published on December 26.

- 1. Grambling State (11–1)
- 2. Tuskegee (9–1)
- 3. Alcorn State (9–2)
- 4. Tennessee State (8–2)
- 5. South Carolina State (8–4)
- 6. Howard (8–2–1)
- 7. Jackson State (7–3)
- 8. Norfolk State (8–2)
- 9. Virginia Union (8–2)
- 10. North Carolina Central (7–2–2)
- 11. Livingstone (8–3)
- 12. Bethune-Cookman (7–3–1)
- 13. Clark (8–1)
- 14. Central State (6–5)
- 15. Knoxville (7–4)
- 16. Texas Southern (6–4)
- 17. Southern (8–3)
- 18. Kentucky State (5–4)
- 19. Fisk (5–4)
- 20. Florida A&M (6–5)
