= 1963 The Citadel Bulldogs football team =

American college football season

1963 The Citadel Bulldogs football
- Conference: Southern Conference
- Record: 4–6 (2–4 SoCon)
- Head coach: Eddie Teague (7th season)
- Home stadium: Johnson Hagood Stadium

1963 Southern Conference football standings
| | Conf. | | | | | Overall |
| Team | W | | L | | T | W | | L | | T |
|---|---|---|---|---|---|---|---|---|---|---|
| Virginia Tech $ | 5 | – | 0 | – | 0 | 8 | – | 2 | – | 0 |
| West Virginia | 3 | – | 1 | – | 0 | 4 | – | 6 | – | 0 |
| VMI | 3 | – | 1 | – | 2 | 3 | – | 5 | – | 2 |
| Furman | 3 | – | 2 | – | 0 | 7 | – | 3 | – | 0 |
| William & Mary | 4 | – | 4 | – | 0 | 4 | – | 6 | – | 0 |
| Richmond | 2 | – | 2 | – | 1 | 3 | – | 6 | – | 1 |
| The Citadel | 2 | – | 4 | – | 0 | 4 | – | 6 | – | 0 |
| George Washington | 1 | – | 5 | – | 0 | 2 | – | 7 | – | 0 |
| Davidson | 0 | – | 4 | – | 1 | 1 | – | 5 | – | 2 |
$ – Conference champion

The 1963 The Citadel Bulldogs football team represented The Citadel, The Military College of South Carolina in the 1963 NCAA University Division football season. Eddie Teague served as head coach for the seventh season. The Bulldogs played as members of the Southern Conference and played home games at Johnson Hagood Stadium.

== Schedule ==
| Date | Opponent | Site | Result | Attendance | Source |
|---|---|---|---|---|---|
| September 21 | William & Mary | Johnson Hagood Stadium; Charleston, SC | L 0–7 | 11,500 | |
| September 28 | at Davidson | Richardson Stadium; Davidson, NC | W 28–6 | | |
| October 4 | at George Washington | District of Columbia Stadium; Washington, DC | W 27–22 | 6,100 | |
| October 12 | vs. Presbyterian* | Grayson Stadium; Savannah, GA | W 24–0 | | |
| October 19 | Arkansas State* | Johnson Hagood Stadium; Charleston, SC | W 10–9 | 9,500 | |
| October 26 | Furman^{†} | Johnson Hagood Stadium; Charleston, SC (rivalry) | L 25–34 | 15,500 | |
| November 2 | East Carolina* | Johnson Hagood Stadium; Charleston, SC | L 6–20 | 7,500 | |
| November 9 | Richmond | Johnson Hagood Stadium; Charleston, SC | L 6–24 | 10,500 | |
| November 16 | at VMI | Alumni Memorial Field; Lexington, VA (rivalry) | L 8–33 | 5,500 | |
| November 23 | at Southern Miss* | Faulkner Field; Hattiesburg, MS | L 12–37 | 4,000 | |
*Non-conference game; ^{†}Homecoming
