= 1963 Furman Paladins football team =

American college football season

1963 Furman Paladins football
- Conference: Southern Conference
- Record: 7–3 (3–2 SoCon)
- Head coach: Bob King (6th season)
- Captain: Doug Stacks
- Home stadium: Sirrine Stadium

1963 Southern Conference football standings
	Conf.					Overall
Team	W		L		T	W		L		T
Virginia Tech $	5	–	0	–	0	8	–	2	–	0
West Virginia	3	–	1	–	0	4	–	6	–	0
VMI	3	–	1	–	2	3	–	5	–	2
Furman	3	–	2	–	0	7	–	3	–	0
William & Mary	4	–	4	–	0	4	–	6	–	0
Richmond	2	–	2	–	1	3	–	6	–	1
The Citadel	2	–	4	–	0	4	–	6	–	0
George Washington	1	–	5	–	0	2	–	7	–	0
Davidson	0	–	4	–	1	1	–	5	–	2
$ – Conference champion

The 1963 Furman Paladins football team was an American football team that represented Furman University as a member of the Southern Conference (SoCon) during the 1963 NCAA University Division football season. In their sixth season under head coach Bob King, Furman compiled a 7–3 record, with a mark of 3–2 in conference play, placing fourth in the SoCon.

== Schedule ==
Date	Opponent	Site	Result	Attendance	Source
September 14	Davidson	Sirrine Stadium; Greenville, SC	W 17–0	4,000	
September 21	at Vanderbilt*	Dudley Field; Nashville, TN	W 14–13		
September 28	George Washington	Sirrine Stadium; Greenville, SC	W 29–14	1,200	
October 5	William & Mary	Sirrine Stadium; Greenville, SC	L 17–27	6,000	
October 12	at Wofford*	Snyder Field; Spartanburg, SC (rivalry)	W 21–19	6,000	
October 19	Mississippi College*	Sirrine Stadium; Greenville, SC	W 41–13	6,000	
October 26	at The Citadel	Johnson Hagood Stadium; Charleston, SC (rivalry)	W 34–25	15,500	
November 2	at Florida State*	Doak Campbell Stadium; Tallahassee, FL	L 6–49	12,000	
November 9	Presbyterian*	Sirrine Stadium; Greenville, SC	W 27–0	9,000	
November 28	at West Virginia	Mountaineer Field; Morgantown, WV	L 7–38	5,000	
*Non-conference game
