= 1961 VMI Keydets football team =

American college football season

1961 VMI Keydets football
- Conference: Southern Conference
- Record: 6–4 (4–2 SoCon)
- Head coach: John McKenna (9th season)
- Home stadium: Wilson Field

1961 Southern Conference football standings
	Conf.					Overall
Team	W		L		T	W		L		T
The Citadel $	5	–	1	–	0	7	–	3	–	0
Richmond	5	–	2	–	0	5	–	5	–	0
VMI	4	–	2	–	0	6	–	4	–	0
West Virginia	2	–	1	–	0	4	–	6	–	0
Furman	2	–	2	–	0	7	–	3	–	0
George Washington	3	–	4	–	0	3	–	6	–	0
Virginia Tech	2	–	3	–	0	4	–	5	–	0
Davidson	1	–	4	–	0	4	–	4	–	0
William & Mary	1	–	6	–	0	1	–	9	–	0
$ – Conference champion

The 1961 VMI Keydets football team was an American football team that represented the Virginia Military Institute (VMI) as a member of the Southern Conference (SoCon) during the 1961 college football season. In their ninth year head under coach John McKenna, the Keydets compiled a 6–4 record (4–2 in conference games), tied for third place in the SoCon, and outscored opponents by a total of 134 to 105.

The team's statistical leaders included Bobby Mitchell (949 passing yards), Stinson Jones (256 rushing yards, 30 points scored), and Ken Reeder (26 receptions, 323 receiving yards).

The team played its one home game at Alumni Field in Lexington, Virginia.

== Schedule ==
Date	Opponent	Site	Result	Attendance	Source
September 16	at Marshall*	Fairfield Stadium; Huntington, WV	W 33–6	8,000	
September 23	at Villanova*	Villanova Stadium; Villanova, PA	L 0–22	12,000	
September 29	at Richmond	City Stadium; Richmond, VA	W 8–6	12,000	
October 7	at George Washington	District of Columbia Stadium; Washington, DC	L 6–30	20,340	
October 14	vs. Virginia*	Foreman Field; Norfolk, VA	L 7–14	8,500	
October 21	at Davidson	Richardson Stadium; Davidson, NC	W 13–0		
October 28	at William & Mary	Cary Field; Williamsburg, VA (rivalry)	W 14–7		
November 4	The Citadel	Wilson Field; Lexington, VA (rivalry)	L 8–14	9,000	
November 11	at Buffalo*	Rotary Field; Buffalo, NY	W 39–6	6,093–6,300	
November 23	vs. Virginia Tech	Victory Stadium; Roanoke, VA (rivalry)	W 6–0	20,000	
*Non-conference game

== Statistics ==
The Keydets gained an average of 113.4 rushing yards and 109.0 passing yards per game. On defense, they gave up an average of 153.4 rushing yards and 93.4 passing yards per game.

Quarterback Bobby Mitchell led the passing offense, completing 69 of 162 passes (42.6%) for 949 yards with six touchdowns, 10 interceptions, and a 91.7 quarterback rating. Butch Nunnally added 106 passing yards, completing nine of 32 passes (28.1%) with one touchdown, three interceptions, and a 47.5 quarterback rating.

Halfback Stinston Jones led the team with 256 rushing yards on 60 carries for a 4.3-yard average. Jones also ranked second on the team with 18 receptions for 305 yards. He also led the team in scoring with 30 points on five touchdowns

Halfback Ken Reeder led the team in receiving with 26 catches for 323 receiving yards.

Other significant contributors included John Traynham (197 yards, 41 receiving yards), Pat Morrison (158 rushing yards, 37 yards), and Butch Armistead (95 rushing yards).

== Awards and honors ==
Three VMI players received second-team honors on the 1961 All-Southern Conference football team: tackle Bill Hoehl; guard Gil Monor; and halfback Stinson Jones.

== Players ==
- Charlie Cole, center, 175 pounds
- J.R. Dunkley, end, 190 pounds
- Bill Hoehl, tackle, 205 pounds
- Stinson Jones, halfback, 185 pounds
- Bobby Mitchell, quarterback, 194 pounds
- Ken Reeder, halfback
- Fred Shirley, guard, 205 pounds
- Jim Shumaker, guard, 205 pounds
- John Traynham, halfback, 185 pounds
- Bill Welsh, tackle, 191 pounds
- Dick Willard, end, 197 pounds
- DeWitt Worrell, fullback, 180 pounds
