= Ed Merrick =

American football player and coach (1912–1994)

Biographical details
- Born: February 8, 1912
- Died: June 14, 1994 (aged 82); Richmond, Virginia, U.S.

Playing career
- 1938–1940: Richmond
- Position: Tackle

Coaching career (HC unless noted)
- 1946–1950: Fork Union Military Academy (VA)
- 1951–1965: Richmond

Head coaching record
- Overall: 53–87–6 (college)

Accomplishments and honors

Awards
- First-team All-SoCon (1939)

Edward J. Merrick (February 8, 1912 – June 14, 1994) was an American football coach. He served as the head football coach at the University of Richmond from 1951 until 1965, compiling record of 53–87–6.

Merrick was inducted into the Virginia Sports Hall of Fame in 1980.

== Head coaching record ==
=== College ===
Year	Team	Overall	Conference	Standing	Bowl/playoffs
Richmond Spiders (Southern Conference) (1951–1965)
1951	Richmond	3–8	2–6	T–12th	
1952	Richmond	1–9	0–6	17th	
1953	Richmond	5–3–1	3–3	T–5th	
1954	Richmond	5–4	2–3	6th	
1955	Richmond	4–3–2	3–2–2	5th	
1956	Richmond	4–5	2–5	7th	
1957	Richmond	4–6	2–4	T–5th	
1958	Richmond	3–7	3–4	5th	
1959	Richmond	4–5–1	4–3–1	5th	
1960	Richmond	3–6–1	3–4–1	6th	
1961	Richmond	5–5	5–2	2nd	
1962	Richmond	6–3	3–2	3rd	
1963	Richmond	3–6–1	2–2–1	T–5th	
1964	Richmond	3–7	2–4	6th	
1965	Richmond	0–10	0–6	9th	
Richmond:		53–87–6	33–52–5		
Total:		53–87–6			
