= Jim Camp =

American football player and coach (1924–2002)

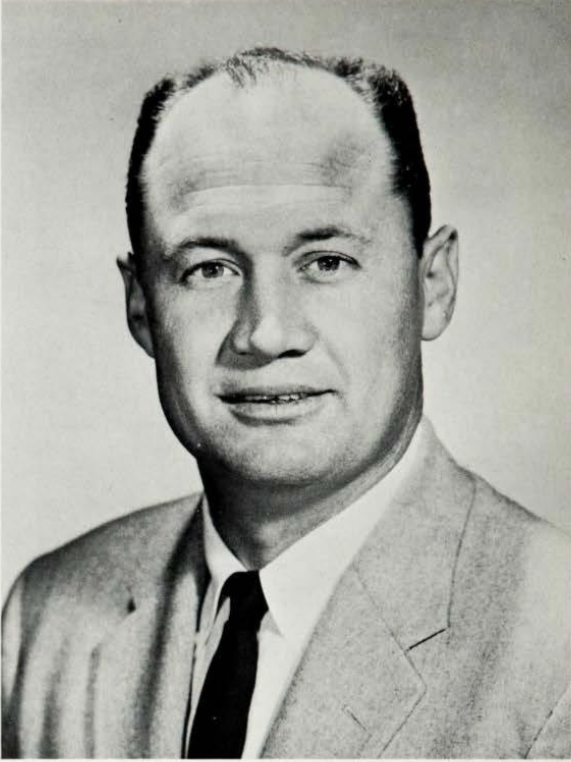
- Camp from 1962 George Washington yearbook

No. 80, 84
- Position: Quarterback

Personal information
- Born: August 8, 1924; Union, South Carolina, U.S.
- Died: January 31, 2002 (aged 77); Durham, North Carolina, U.S.
- Listed height: 6 ft 0 in (1.83 m)
- Listed weight: 162 lb (73 kg)

Career information
- College: Randolph-Macon (1942); North Carolina (1944–1947)
- NFL draft: 1948: 8th round, 65th overall pick

Career history

Playing
- Brooklyn Dodgers (1948)

Coaching
- North Carolina (1949–1950) Freshmen; North Carolina (1951–1952) Backfield; Mississippi State (1953) Assistant; Minnesota (1954–1960) Backfield; George Washington (1961–1966) Head coach; UCLA (1967–1969)

Awards and highlights
- SoCon Coach of the Year (1966)

Career AAFC statistics
- Rushing yards: 43
- Rushing average: 5.4
- Receptions: 1
- Receiving yards: 43
- Stats at Pro Football Reference

Head coaching record
- Regular season: College: 23–34 (.404)

James Vernon Camp (August 8, 1924 – January 31, 2002) was an American football player and coach. He served as the head football coach at George Washington University from 1961 to 1966, compiling a record of 23–34. A native of Danville, Virginia, Camp played college football at Randolph–Macon College in 1942 and at the University of North Carolina at Chapel Hill from 1944 to 1947. He played professionally for one season, in 1948, with the Brooklyn Dodgers of the All-America Football Conference (AAFC).

== Head coaching record ==
Year	Team	Overall	Conference	Standing	Bowl/playoffs
George Washington Colonials (Southern Conference) (1961–1966)
1961	George Washington	3–6	3–4	6th	
1962	George Washington	3–7	1–5	8th	
1963	George Washington	2–7	1–5	8th	
1964	George Washington	5–4	3–2	3rd	
1965	George Washington	5–5	4–3	5th	
1966	George Washington	5–5	4–3	4th	
George Washington:		23–34	16–22		
Total:		23–34			
