= 1961 Virginia Tech Gobblers football team =

American college football season

1961 Virginia Tech Gobblers football
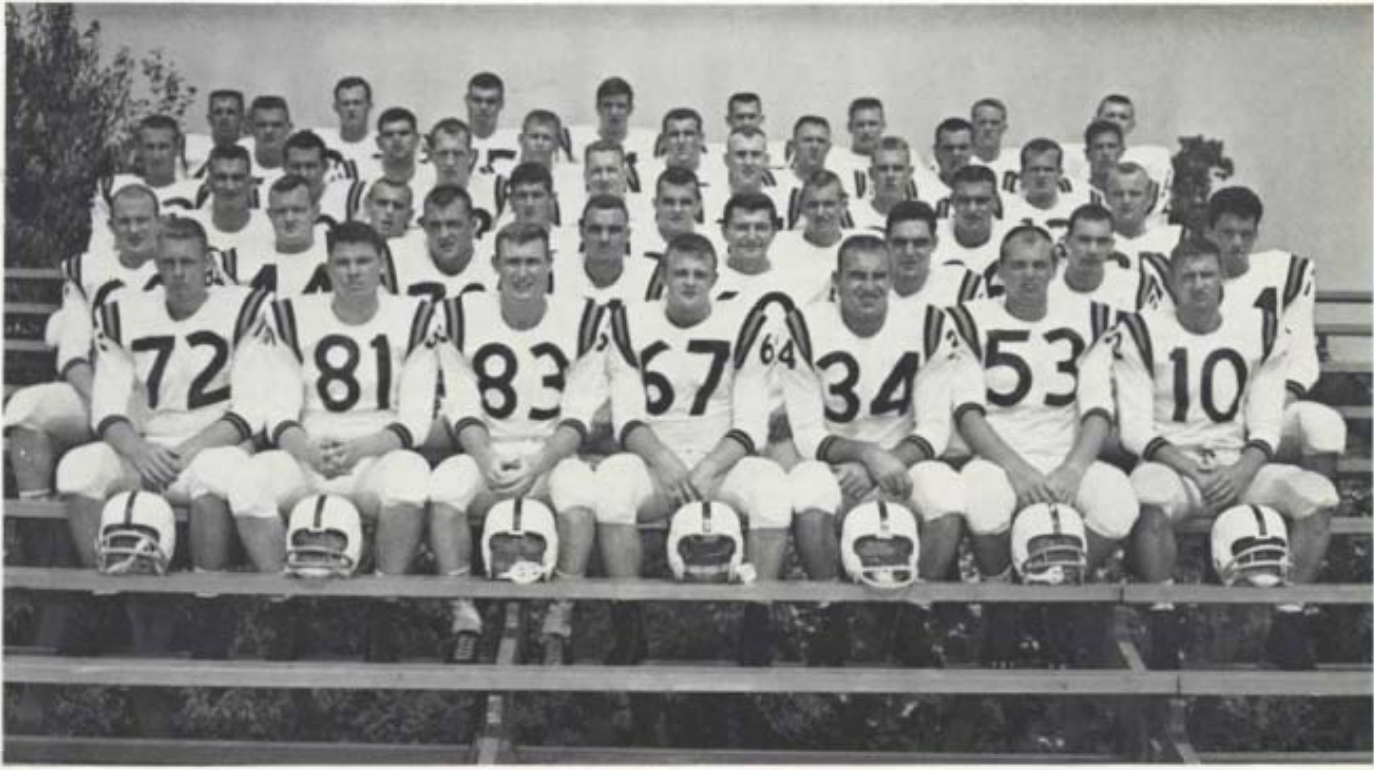
- Conference: Southern Conference
- Record: 4–5 (2–3 SoCon)
- Head coach: Jerry Claiborne (1st season)
- Home stadium: Miles Stadium

1961 Southern Conference football standings
	Conf.					Overall
Team	W		L		T	W		L		T
The Citadel $	5	–	1	–	0	7	–	3	–	0
Richmond	5	–	2	–	0	5	–	5	–	0
VMI	4	–	2	–	0	6	–	4	–	0
West Virginia	2	–	1	–	0	4	–	6	–	0
Furman	2	–	2	–	0	7	–	3	–	0
George Washington	3	–	4	–	0	3	–	6	–	0
Virginia Tech	2	–	3	–	0	4	–	5	–	0
Davidson	1	–	4	–	0	4	–	4	–	0
William & Mary	1	–	6	–	0	1	–	9	–	0
$ – Conference champion

The 1961 Virginia Tech Gobblers football team, also known as the VPI Gobblers, was an American football team that represented the Virginia Polytechnic Institute (now known as Virginia Polytechnic Institute and State University or Virginia Tech) as a member of the Southern Conference (SoCon) during the 1961 college football season. In their first year under head coach Jerry Claiborne, the Gobblers compiled a 4–5 record (2–3 in conference games), finished seventh in the SoCon, and were outscored by a total of 112 to 93.

Quarterback Warren Price led the team in passing yards (381), rushing yards (356), and total offense (736 yards). Price was described as "the heart and soul of the Tech offense, a genuine triple-threater."

The team played its home games at Miles Stadium in Blacksburg, Virginia.

== Schedule ==
Date	Time	Opponent	Site	Result	Attendance	Source
September 16		vs. William & Mary	Victory Stadium; Roanoke, VA	W 20–6	5,000	
October 7		at West Virginia	Mountaineer Field; Morgantown, WV (rivalry)	L 0–28	15,000	
October 14		at Tulane*	Tulane Stadium; New Orleans, LA	L 14–27		
October 21	2:30 p.m.	vs. Virginia*	Victory Stadium; Roanoke, VA (Harvest Bowl, rivalry)	W 20–0	17,000	
October 28		Florida State*^{†}	Miles Stadium; Blacksburg, VA	W 10–7	14,000	
November 4		at Richmond	City Stadium; Richmond, VA	L 0–11	14,000	
November 11		at Wake Forest*	Bowman Gray Stadium; Winston-Salem, NC	L 15–24	8,000	
November 17	1:15 p.m.	George Washington	Miles Stadium; Blacksburg, VA	W 14–3	5,000	
November 23		vs. VMI	Victory Stadium; Roanoke, VA (rivalry)	L 0–6	20,000	
*Non-conference game; ^{†}Homecoming; All times are in Eastern time

== Statistics ==
Quarterback Warren Price led the team in passing (37-for-93, 39.8%, 381 yards, five touchdowns, five interceptions), rushing (356 yards on 93 carries, 3.8-yard average), total offense (736 yards), and scoring.

Other significant contributors included Gerald Bobbitte (261 rushing yards, 62 carries, 4.2-yard average) and Terry Strock (223 rushing yards, 68 receiving yards), Buddy Perry (212 rushing yards, 61 receiving yards), and Buddy Weihe (148 rushing yards, 85 receiving yards).

== Awards and honors ==
Three Virginia Tech players were selected as first-team players on the 1961 Virginia All-Big Five football team: quarterback Warren Price; back Terry Strock; and tackle Joe Moss. Two others were placed on the second team: end Leon Tomblin and guard Ray Barile. Three others received honorable mention: back Gerald Bobbitte; tackle Gene Breen; and guard Newt Green.

Tackle Gene Breen was selected as a first-team player on the 1961 All-Southern Conference football team. Tackle Joe Moss and quarterback Warren Price were named to the second team.

== Personnel ==
=== Players ===
The following players received varsity letters for their participation on the 1961 Virginia Tech football team:

- Ray Barile, guard, senior
- Herb Bowling, end-linebacker, junior
- Gene Breen, tackle, sophomore, 6'2", 210 pounds
- Bloice Davison, guard, senior
- John Farmer, tackle, senior
- Dave Gillespie, center
- Dick Goode, end, junior
- Ron Hawkins, halfback, junior
- Charlie Hines, center, senior
- Gerald Holbrook, guard, senior
- Warren Maccaroni, fullback, senior
- Ray Massie, halfback, junior
- Joe Moss, tackle, senior, 6'4", 233 pounds, Burkes Garden, VA
- Noah Redding "Buddy" Perry, halfback, senior
- Warren Price, quarterback/halfback, senior, 5'10", 165 pounds, Miami, FL
- Aster "Cat" Sizemore, back, junior
- Charlie Speck, end, senior
- Terry L. Strock, quarterback, senior, 5'10", 172 pounds, Hagerstown, MD
- Leon Tomblin, end, senior

Other players identified from the roster published in the 1962 edition of The Bugle, the Virginia Tech yearbook, included:

- Jake Adams, end
- Kyle Marlon Albright, center
- William McLemore "Billy" Babb, halfback
- Gerald Bobbitte
- Harold Bolden, halfback
- Mike Cahill, halfback/quarterback
- Alex Camaioni, guard
- Phillip W. Cary
- Pete Cartwright, halfback
- Dickie Cranwell
- Lacy Lee Edwards, Jr., halfback
- Randall Edwards, center
- Ronald Wayne Frank
- David Green, guard
- Walter Newton Green, Jr.
- Thomas Morgan Hawkins, halfback
- James Venable Hickam, guard
- Don Jensen, guard
- John W. Minichan, tackle
- Bob Peak, tackle
- Art Pruett, fullback
- Bill Robertson, tackle
- Joseph Gilleece "Skip" Vance, halfback
- Al Verthein, halfback
- Thomas Merritt Walker, halfback
- K. T. "Buddy" Weihe, halfback
- Roger Whitley, fullback

=== Coaches and administration ===
- Head coach: Jerry Claiborne (1st year)
- Assistant coaches: John Shelton, Cecil Ingram, Jack Prater, Bob Edwards, Doug Shively, Dick Redding (freshmen coach), Bill Conde
- Athletic director: Frank O. Moseley
