= 1963 Davidson Wildcats football team =

American college football season

1963 Davidson Wildcats football
- Conference: Southern Conference
- Record: 1–5–2 (0–4–1 SoCon)
- Head coach: Bill Dole (12th season)
- Home stadium: Richardson Stadium

1963 Southern Conference football standings
	Conf.					Overall
Team	W		L		T	W		L		T
Virginia Tech $	5	–	0	–	0	8	–	2	–	0
West Virginia	3	–	1	–	0	4	–	6	–	0
VMI	3	–	1	–	2	3	–	5	–	2
Furman	3	–	2	–	0	7	–	3	–	0
William & Mary	4	–	4	–	0	4	–	6	–	0
Richmond	2	–	2	–	1	3	–	6	–	1
The Citadel	2	–	4	–	0	4	–	6	–	0
George Washington	1	–	5	–	0	2	–	7	–	0
Davidson	0	–	4	–	1	1	–	5	–	2
$ – Conference champion

The 1963 Davidson Wildcats football team represented Davidson College as a member of the Southern Conference (SoCon) during the 1963 NCAA University Division football season. Led by 12th-year head coach Bill Dole, the Wildcats compiled an overall record of 1–5–2 with a mark of 0–4–1 in conference play, placing last out of ninth teams in the SoCon.

== Schedule ==
Date	Opponent	Site	Result	Attendance	Source
September 14	at Furman	Sirrine Stadium; Greenville, SC	L 0–17	4,000	
September 20	vs. Catawba*	American Legion Memorial Stadium; Charlotte, NC	L 14–18		
September 28	The Citadel	Richardson Stadium; Davidson, NC	L 6–28		
October 5	VMI	Richardson Stadium; Davidson, NC	T 10–10	5,000	
October 19	at Richmond	City Stadium; Richmond, VA	L 13–21	5,000	
October 26	Presbyterian*^{†}	Richardson Stadium; Davidson, NC	T 14–14	8,000	
November 9	Lehigh*	Richardson Stadium; Davidson, NC	W 7–3	6,000	
November 16	at William & Mary	Cary Field; Williamsburg, VA	L 5–34	4,000	
*Non-conference game; ^{†}Homecoming
