= 1961 The Citadel Bulldogs football team =

American college football season

1961 The Citadel Bulldogs football

SoCon champion
- Conference: Southern Conference
- Record: 7–3 (5–1 SoCon)
- Head coach: Eddie Teague (5th season)
- Home stadium: Johnson Hagood Stadium

1961 Southern Conference football standings
	Conf.					Overall
Team	W		L		T	W		L		T
The Citadel $	5	–	1	–	0	7	–	3	–	0
Richmond	5	–	2	–	0	5	–	5	–	0
VMI	4	–	2	–	0	6	–	4	–	0
West Virginia	2	–	1	–	0	4	–	6	–	0
Furman	2	–	2	–	0	7	–	3	–	0
George Washington	3	–	4	–	0	3	–	6	–	0
Virginia Tech	2	–	3	–	0	4	–	5	–	0
Davidson	1	–	4	–	0	4	–	4	–	0
William & Mary	1	–	6	–	0	1	–	9	–	0
$ – Conference champion

The 1961 The Citadel Bulldogs football team was an American football team that represented The Citadel, The Military College of South Carolina, as a memberof the Southern Conference (SoCon) during the 1961 college football season. In their fifth year under head coach Eddie Teague, the Bulldogs compiled a 7–3 record (5–1 in conference games, and won the program's first SoCon championship since joining the conference in 1936.

After the season, the Bulldogs declined two bowl invitations. The first to be offered was the Tangerine Bowl. The Citadel had appeared in the previous edition of this small-college bowl in 1960 and elected to decline the repeat trip. Later, the Bulldogs declined an invitation to the Aviation Bowl.

The team's statistical leaders included quarterback Bill Whaley (980 passing yards), halfback Earley Eastburn (307 rushing yards), and Charley Brendle (20 receptions, 303 receiving yards). Eastburn and Bill Gilgo received first-team honors on the 1961 All-Southern Conference football team.

The team played its home games at Johnson Hagood Stadium in Charleston, South Carolina.

== Schedule ==
Date	Opponent	Site	Result	Attendance	Source
September 16	at Memphis State*	Crump Stadium; Memphis, TN	L 0–40	17,345	
September 23	George Washington	Johnson Hagood Stadium; Charleston, SC	L 13–17	11,200	
September 30	Davidson	Johnson Hagood Stadium; Charleston, SC	W 20–12		
October 7	Richmond	Johnson Hagood Stadium; Charleston, SC	W 24–6	17,250	
October 14	at William & Mary	Cary Field; Williamsburg, VA	W 10–8	6,200	
October 21	Furman	Johnson Hagood Stadium; Charleston, SC (rivalry)	W 9–8	16,200	
October 28	at Xavier*	Xavier Stadium; Cincinnati, Ohio	W 7–6	9,789	
November 4	at VMI	Wilson Field; Lexington, VA (rivalry)	W 14–8	9,000	
November 11	at Florida State*	Doak Campbell Stadium; Tallahassee, FL	L 8–44	14,600	
November 18	Arkansas State*^{†}	Johnson Hagood Stadium; Charleston, SC	W 28–6	13,100	
*Non-conference game; ^{†}Homecoming

== Statistics ==
The Bulldogs gained an average of 113.7 rushing yards and 135.4 passing yards per game. On defense, they gave up an average of 220.9 rushing yards and 83.8 passing yards per game.

Senior quarterback Bill Whaley completed 78 of 148 passes for 980 yards with four touchdowns, 10 interceptions, and a 103.7 quarterback rating.

Halfback Earley Eastburn led the team in rushing with 307 yards on 83 carries for an average of 3.7 yards per carry. He also ranked second in receiving with 11 catches for 196 yards.

Charley Brendle led the team in receiving with 20 catches for 303 yards and four touchdowns.

== Awards and honors ==
Quarterback Bill Whaley was selected by his teammates as the team's most valuable player. Senior tackle Jim Reiney was selected as the outstanding lineman, and guard Gene Dice was named outstanding defensive player.

End Bill Gilgo and halfback Earley Eastburn were selected as first-team players on the 1961 All-Southern Conference football team. End Charles Brendle and guard Ed Herrington were named to the second team.

== Personnel ==
=== Players ===
- Bill Allen
- Charley Brendle
- John Clancy, halfback
- Bobby Crouch, halfback
- Gene Dice, guard
- Belton Dykes, fullback
- Earley Eastburn, halfback
- Tommy Edwards, halfback
- Bill Gilgo
- Ed Gould
- Bobby Jackson, fullback
- Sid Mitchell
- Vince Petno
- Jim Reiney, tackle
- Bill Whaley, quarterback

=== Coaching staff ===
- Head coach: Eddie Teague
