= 1963 VMI Keydets football team =

American college football season

1963 VMI Keydets football
- Conference: Southern Conference
- Record: 3–5–2 (3–1–2 SoCon)
- Head coach: John McKenna (11th season)
- Home stadium: Alumni Field

1963 Southern Conference football standings
	Conf.					Overall
Team	W		L		T	W		L		T
Virginia Tech $	5	–	0	–	0	8	–	2	–	0
West Virginia	3	–	1	–	0	4	–	6	–	0
VMI	3	–	1	–	2	3	–	5	–	2
Furman	3	–	2	–	0	7	–	3	–	0
William & Mary	4	–	4	–	0	4	–	6	–	0
Richmond	2	–	2	–	1	3	–	6	–	1
The Citadel	2	–	4	–	0	4	–	6	–	0
George Washington	1	–	5	–	0	2	–	7	–	0
Davidson	0	–	4	–	1	1	–	5	–	2
$ – Conference champion

The 1963 VMI Keydets football team was an American football team that represented the Virginia Military Institute (VMI) as a member of the Southern Conference (SoCon) during the 1963 NCAA University Division football season. In their 11th year under head coach John McKenna, the team compiled an overall record of 3–5–2 with a mark of 3–1–2 in conference play, placing third in the SoCon.

== Schedule ==
Date	Opponent	Site	Result	Attendance	Source
September 21	George Washington	Alumni Memorial Field; Lexington, VA	W 14–6	6,500	
September 28	at Iowa State*	Clyde Williams Field; Ames, IA	L 6–21	14,530	
October 5	at Davidson	Richardson Field; Davidson, NC	T 10–10	5,000	
October 12	vs. Virginia*	City Stadium; Richmond, VA	L 0–6	10,000	
October 19	vs. No. 10 Navy*	Foreman Field; Norfolk, VA (Oyster Bowl)	L 12–21	31,500	
October 25	at Richmond	City Stadium; Richmond, VA (rivalry)	T 7–7		
November 2	at William & Mary	Cary Field; Williamsburg, VA (rivalry)	W 26–6		
November 9	at Holy Cross*	Fitton Field; Worcester, MA	L 12–14	7,500	
November 16	The Citadel	Alumni Memorial Field; Lexington, VA (rivalry)	W 33–8	5,500	
November 28	vs. Virginia Tech	Victory Stadium; Roanoke, VA (rivalry)	L 20–35	27,000	
*Non-conference game; Rankings from AP Poll released prior to the game
