= 1961 William & Mary Indians football team =

American college football season

1961 William & Mary Indians football
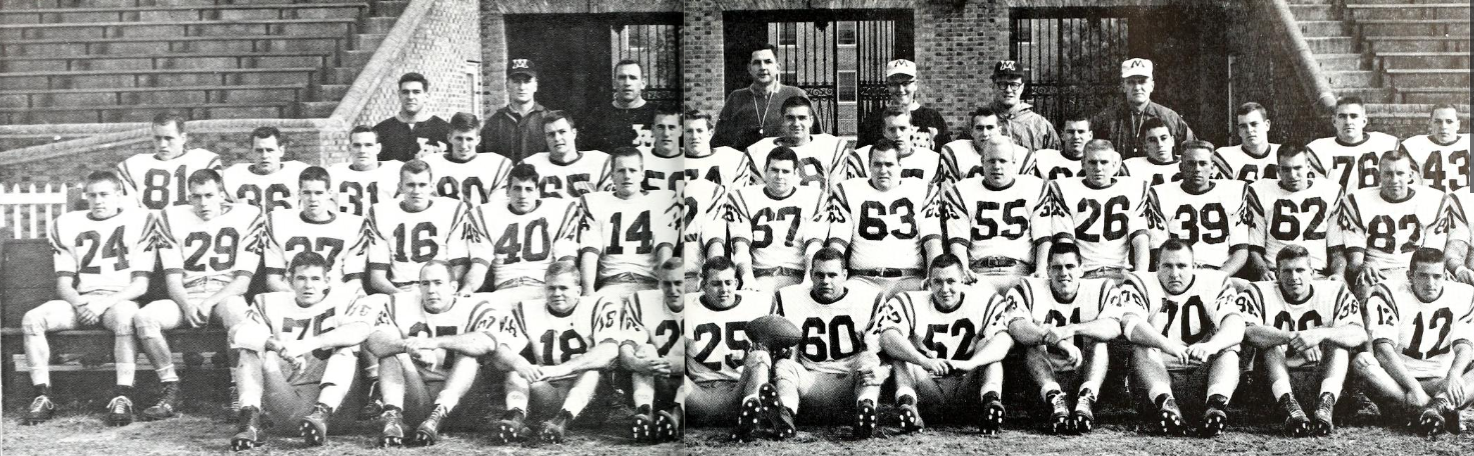
- Team portrait from 1962 Colonial Echo
- Conference: Southern Conference
- Record: 1–9 (1–6 SoCon)
- Head coach: Milt Drewer (5th season)
- Captains: Roger Hale; Eric Erdossy
- Home stadium: Cary Field

1961 Southern Conference football standings
	Conf.					Overall
Team	W		L		T	W		L		T
The Citadel $	5	–	1	–	0	7	–	3	–	0
Richmond	5	–	2	–	0	5	–	5	–	0
VMI	4	–	2	–	0	6	–	4	–	0
West Virginia	2	–	1	–	0	4	–	6	–	0
Furman	2	–	2	–	0	7	–	3	–	0
George Washington	3	–	4	–	0	3	–	6	–	0
Virginia Tech	2	–	3	–	0	4	–	5	–	0
Davidson	1	–	4	–	0	4	–	4	–	0
William & Mary	1	–	6	–	0	1	–	9	–	0
$ – Conference champion

The 1961 William & Mary Indians football team was an American football team that represented the College of William & Mary as a member of the Southern Conference (SoCon) during the 1961 college football season. In their fifth season under head coach Milt Drewer, William & Mary compiled a 1–9 record (1–6 in conference games), finished in last place in the SoCon, and were outscored by a total of 279 to 125.

The team's statistical leaders included Dan Henning (537 passing yards), Stan Penkunas (327 rushing yards), and Ernie Phillips (299 receiving yards).

The team played its home games at Cary Field in Williamsburg, Virginia.

== Schedule ==
Date	Opponent	Site	Result	Attendance	Source
September 16	vs. Virginia Tech	Victory Stadium; Roanoke, VA	L 6–20	5,000	
September 23	at Virginia*	Scott Stadium; Charlottesville, VA	L 6–21	18,000	
September 30	at Navy*	Navy–Marine Corps Memorial Stadium; Annapolis, MD	L 6–44	17,803	
October 7	Furman	Cary Field; Williamsburg, VA	W 19–6	4,000	
October 14	The Citadel	Cary Field; Williamsburg, VA	L 8–10	6,200	
October 21	at George Washington	District of Columbia Stadium; Washington, DC	L 12–49	9,280	
October 28	VMI	Cary Field; Williamsburg, VA (rivalry)	L 7–14		
November 4	Davidson	Cary Field; Williamsburg, VA	L 30–31		
November 11	at Army*	Michie Stadium; West Point, NY	L 13–48	18,150	
November 23	at Richmond	City Stadium; Richmond, VA (rivalry)	L 18–36	8,000	
*Non-conference game

== Statistics ==
William & Mary gained an average of 122.5 rushing yards and 116.4 passing yards per game. On defense, they gave up 212.3 rushing yards and 96.6 passing yards per game.

Three players split time at quarterback: Dan Henning (30-for-86, 537 yards, five touchdowns, eight interceptions); Calvin Cox (41-for-69, 59.4%, three touchdowns, eight interceptions); and Dan Barton (14-for-33, 196 yards, no touchdowns, six interceptions).

Six backs rushed for over 100 yards: Stan Penkunas (327 yards, 63 carries, 5.2-yard average); Roger Hale (326 yards, 72 carries, 4.5-yard average); Charlie Weaver (151 yards, 42 carries, 3.6-yard average); H.C. Thaxton (138 yards, 38 carries, 3.6-yard average); Dick Kern (110 yards, 19 carries, 5.8-yard average); and Dan Barton (106 yards, 38 carries, 2.8-yard average).

The leading receivers were Ernie Phillips (26 receptions, 299 yards); Bill Corley (14 receptions, 218 yards); and Roger Hale (14 receptions, 182 yards).

== Awards and honors ==
Guard Eric Erdossy was named to the first team of the 1961 All-Southern Conference football team. End Ernie Phillips, tackle John Sapinsky, and back Roger Hale were named to the second team.

== Personnel ==
=== Players ===
- Dan Barton
- Bill Corley
- Calvin Cox
- Eric Erdossy, guard
- Roger Hale, back
- Dan Henning
- Dick Kern
- Dennis O'Toole
- Stan Penkunas
- Ernie Phillips, end
- John Sapinksy, tackle
- Walt Scott
- H.C. Thaxton
- Charlie Weaver

=== Coaches and administrators ===
- Head coach: Milt Drewer
- Assistant coaches: Ed Derringe, Dante "Danny" Defalco, Dave Nusz, Larry Peccatiello, Lou Holtz
