= 1961 George Washington Colonials football team =

American college football season

1961 George Washington Colonials football
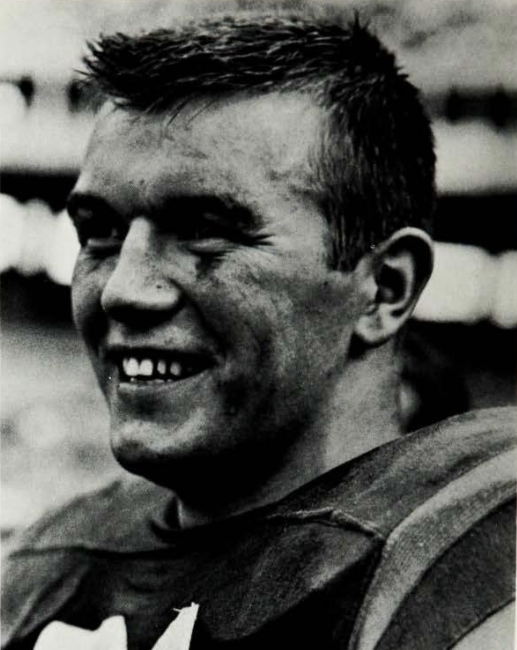
- Back Dick Drummond
- Conference: Southern Conference
- Record: 3–6 (3–4 SoCon)
- Head coach: Jim Camp (1st season)
- Home stadium: District of Columbia Stadium

1961 Southern Conference football standings
| | Conf. | | | | | Overall |
| Team | W | | L | | T | W | | L | | T |
|---|---|---|---|---|---|---|---|---|---|---|
| The Citadel $ | 5 | – | 1 | – | 0 | 7 | – | 3 | – | 0 |
| Richmond | 5 | – | 2 | – | 0 | 5 | – | 5 | – | 0 |
| VMI | 4 | – | 2 | – | 0 | 6 | – | 4 | – | 0 |
| West Virginia | 2 | – | 1 | – | 0 | 4 | – | 6 | – | 0 |
| Furman | 2 | – | 2 | – | 0 | 7 | – | 3 | – | 0 |
| George Washington | 3 | – | 4 | – | 0 | 3 | – | 6 | – | 0 |
| Virginia Tech | 2 | – | 3 | – | 0 | 4 | – | 5 | – | 0 |
| Davidson | 1 | – | 4 | – | 0 | 4 | – | 4 | – | 0 |
| William & Mary | 1 | – | 6 | – | 0 | 1 | – | 9 | – | 0 |
$ – Conference champion

The 1961 George Washington Colonials football team was an American football team that represented George Washington University as a member of the Southern Conference (SoCon) during the 1961 college football season. In their first season under head coach Jim Camp, the Colonials compiled a 3–6 record (3–4 in conference games), finished in sixth place in the SoCon, and outscored opponents by a total of 143 to 121.

The team's statistical leaders included quarterback Bill Hardy (373 passing yards), Dick Drummond (632 rushing yards, 183 receiving yards, 30 points scored).

The team played its home games at District of Columbia Stadium in Washington, D.C.

== Schedule ==
| Date | Opponent | Site | Result | Attendance | Source |
|---|---|---|---|---|---|
| September 16 | at Florida State* | Doak Campbell Stadium; Tallahassee, FL | L 7–15 | 19,200 | |
| September 23 | at The Citadel | Johnson Hagood Stadium; Charleston, SC | W 17–13 | 11,200 | |
| September 30 | at Furman | Sirrine Stadium; Greenville, SC | L 9–13 | 9,500 | |
| October 7 | VMI | District of Columbia Stadium; Washington, DC | W 30–6 | 20,340 | |
| October 14 | at Richmond | City Stadium; Richmond, VA | L 15–16 | 1,800 | |
| October 20 | William & Mary | District of Columbia Stadium; Washington, DC | W 49–12 | 9,280 | |
| October 27 | Boston University* | District of Columbia Stadium; Washington, DC | L 6–20 | 7,800 | |
| November 4 | West Virginia | District of Columbia Stadium; Washington, DC | L 7–12 | 9,395 | |
| November 17 | at Virginia Tech | Miles Stadium; Blacksburg, VA | L 3–14 | 5,000 | |
*Non-conference game

== Statistics ==
The Colonials gained an average of 174.3 rushing yards and 67.1 passing yards per game. On defense, they gave up 192.0 rushing yards and 94.3 passing yards per game.

The team's passing offense was led by quarterbacks Bill Hardy and Frank Pazzaglia. Hardy completed 33 of 67 passes (49.3%) for 373 yards with three touchdowns, six interceptions, and a 92.9 quarterback rating. Pazzaglia completed 16 of 37 passes (43.2%) for 211 yards with one touchdown, five interceptions, and 73.0 quarterback rating.

Five George Washington players had over 35 carries, led by Dick Drummond (632 rushing yards), Louie DeSimone (338 rushing yards), Jim Johnson (135 rushing yards), Tony Fredicine (126 rushing yards), and Frank Pazzaglia (89 yards).

The team's leading receivers were Dick Drummond (12 receptions, 183 yards), Andy Guida (11 receptions, 127 yards), and Alex Sokaris (eight receptions, 117 yards).

== Awards and honors ==
End Andy Guida and back Dick Drummond were both selected as first-team picks on the 1961 All-Southern Conference football team. Guard Gary Scollick was named to the second team. Tackle Steve Bartnicki received honorable mention.

== Personnel ==
=== Players ===
- Cliff Boytos
- Louie DeSimone
- Dick Drummond
- Dick Duenkel
- Tony Fredicine
- Andy Guida
- Bill Hardy
- Joe Heilman
- Jim Johnson
- Paul Munley
- Paul Pazzaglia
- Rudy Pohl
- Gary Scollick
- Alex Sokaris

=== Coaching staff ===
- Head coach: Jim Camp
- Assistant coaches: Bill Dooley (line), Bob Collins (backfield)
