= 1963 West Virginia Mountaineers football team =

American college football season

1963 West Virginia Mountaineers football
- Conference: Southern Conference
- Record: 4–6 (3–1 SoCon)
- Head coach: Gene Corum (4th season)
- Home stadium: Mountaineer Field

1963 Southern Conference football standings
	Conf.					Overall
Team	W		L		T	W		L		T
Virginia Tech $	5	–	0	–	0	8	–	2	–	0
West Virginia	3	–	1	–	0	4	–	6	–	0
VMI	3	–	1	–	2	3	–	5	–	2
Furman	3	–	2	–	0	7	–	3	–	0
William & Mary	4	–	4	–	0	4	–	6	–	0
Richmond	2	–	2	–	1	3	–	6	–	1
The Citadel	2	–	4	–	0	4	–	6	–	0
George Washington	1	–	5	–	0	2	–	7	–	0
Davidson	0	–	4	–	1	1	–	5	–	2
$ – Conference champion

The 1963 West Virginia Mountaineers football team represented West Virginia University as a member of the Southern Conference (SoCon) during the 1963 NCAA University Division football season. Led by fourth-year head coach Gene Corum, the Mountaineers compiled an overall record of 4–6 with a mark of 3–1 in conference play, placing second in the SoCon.

== Schedule ==
Date	Opponent	Site	Result	Attendance	Source
September 21	No. 9 Navy*	Mountaineer Field; Morgantown, WV	L 7–51	35,000	
September 28	at Boston University*	Nickerson Field; Boston, MA	W 34–0	7,000	
October 5	Oregon*	Mountaineer Field; Morgantown, WV	L 0–35	24,000	
October 12	at William & Mary	Cary Field; Williamsburg, VA	W 20–16	11,500	
October 19	No. 3 Pittsburgh*	Mountaineer Field; Morgantown, WV (rivalry)	L 10–13	31,000	
October 26	at Penn State*	Beaver Stadium; University Park, PA (rivalry)	L 9–20	45,750	
November 2	at George Washington	District of Columbia Stadium; Washington, DC	W 20–16	8,000	
November 9	at Syracuse*	Archbold Stadium; Syracuse, NY (rivalry)	L 13–15	22,000	
November 16	Virginia Tech	Mountaineer Field; Morgantown, WV (rivalry)	L 3–28	15,000	
November 28	Furman	Mountaineer Field; Morgantown, WV	W 38–7	5,000	
*Non-conference game; Rankings from AP Poll released prior to the game
