= 1963 Richmond Spiders football team =

American college football season

1963 Richmond Spiders football
- Conference: Southern Conference
- Record: 3–6–1 (2–2–1 SoCon)
- Head coach: Ed Merrick (13th season)
- Captains: J. Helvin; J. Kessel; B. Drobney
- Home stadium: City Stadium

1963 Southern Conference football standings
	Conf.					Overall
Team	W		L		T	W		L		T
Virginia Tech $	5	–	0	–	0	8	–	2	–	0
West Virginia	3	–	1	–	0	4	–	6	–	0
VMI	3	–	1	–	2	3	–	5	–	2
Furman	3	–	2	–	0	7	–	3	–	0
William & Mary	4	–	4	–	0	4	–	6	–	0
Richmond	2	–	2	–	1	3	–	6	–	1
The Citadel	2	–	4	–	0	4	–	6	–	0
George Washington	1	–	5	–	0	2	–	7	–	0
Davidson	0	–	4	–	1	1	–	5	–	2
$ – Conference champion

The 1963 Richmond Spiders football team was an American football team that represented the University of Richmond as a member of the Southern Conference (SoCon) during the 1963 NCAA University Division football season. In their thirteenth season under head coach Ed Merrick, Richmond compiled a 3–6–1 record, with a mark of 2–2–1 in conference play, finishing in sixth place in the SoCon.

== Schedule ==
Date	Opponent	Site	Result	Attendance	Source
September 14	East Carolina*	City Stadium; Richmond, VA	W 10–7	7,000	
September 21	at Tennessee*	Neyland Stadium; Knoxville, TN	L 6–34	24,842	
October 5	at Florida*	Florida Field; Gainesville, FL	L 28–35	26,871	
October 12	at Southern Miss*	Faulkner Field; Hattiesburg, MS	L 0–7	10,000	
October 19	Davidson	City Stadium; Richmond, VA	W 21–13	5,000	
October 25	VMI	City Stadium; Richmond, VA (rivalry)	T 7–7		
November 2	Virginia Tech	City Stadium; Richmond, VA	L 13–14	18,000	
November 9	at The Citadel	Johnson Hagood Stadium; Charleston, SC	W 24–6	10,500	
November 16	at Syracuse*	Archbold Stadium; Syracuse, NY	L 0–50	20,000	
November 28	William & Mary	City Stadium; Richmond, VA (rivalry)	L 6–29	11,500	
*Non-conference game
