= 1961 Richmond Spiders football team =

American college football season

1961 Richmond Spiders football
- Conference: Southern Conference
- Record: 5–5 (5–2 SoCon)
- Head coach: Ed Merrick (11th season)
- Captains: Art McGee; Earl Stoudt
- Home stadium: City Stadium

1961 Southern Conference football standings
	Conf.					Overall
Team	W		L		T	W		L		T
The Citadel $	5	–	1	–	0	7	–	3	–	0
Richmond	5	–	2	–	0	5	–	5	–	0
VMI	4	–	2	–	0	6	–	4	–	0
West Virginia	2	–	1	–	0	4	–	6	–	0
Furman	2	–	2	–	0	7	–	3	–	0
George Washington	3	–	4	–	0	3	–	6	–	0
Virginia Tech	2	–	3	–	0	4	–	5	–	0
Davidson	1	–	4	–	0	4	–	4	–	0
William & Mary	1	–	6	–	0	1	–	9	–	0
$ – Conference champion

The 1961 Richmond Spiders football team was an American football team that represented the University of Richmond as a member of the Southern Conference (SoCon) during the 1961 college football season. In their eleventh season under head coach Ed Merrick, Richmond compiled a 5–5 record (5–2 in conference games), and were outscored by a total of 194 to 143.

The team's statistical leaders included quarterback Mel Rideout with 808 passing yards, Earl Stoudt with 704 rushing yards, and John Hilton with 334 receiving yards.

The team played its home games at City Stadium in Richmond, Virginia.

== Schedule ==
Date	Opponent	Site	Result	Attendance	Source
September 16	at West Virginia	Mountaineer Field; Morgantown, WV	W 35–26	12,000	
September 23	at Army*	Michie Stadium; West Point, NY	L 6–24	11,250	
September 29	VMI	City Stadium; Richmond, VA (rivalry)	L 6–8	12,000	
October 7	at The Citadel	Johnson Hagood Stadium; Charleston, SC	L 6–24	17,250	
October 14	George Washington	City Stadium; Richmond, VA	W 16–15	1,800	
October 21	at Florida State*	Doak Campbell Stadium; Tallahassee, FL	L 7–13	13,600	
October 28	Davidson	City Stadium; Richmond, VA	W 20–0	3,000	
November 4	Virginia Tech	City Stadium; Richmond, VA	W 11–0	14,000	
November 11	at No. 2 Alabama*	Denny Stadium; Tuscaloosa, AL	L 0–66	28,000	
November 23	William & Mary	City Stadium; Richmond, VA (rivalry)	W 36–18	8,000	
*Non-conference game; Rankings from AP Poll released prior to the game

== Statistics ==
The Spiders gainedan average of 144.0 rushing yards and 99.7 passing yards per game. On defense, they gave up an average of 156.5 rushing yards and 106.5 passing yards per game.

Quarterback Mel Rideout completed 68 of 178 passes (38.2%) for 808 yards wit seven touchdowns, 11 interceptions, and a 77.0 quarterback rating.

Halfback and co-captain Earl Stoudt led the team in rushing with 704 rushing yards on 162 carries for an average of 4.3 yards per carry. He also caught 21 passes for 183 yards and completed four of seven passes for 53 yards.

End John Hilton led the team with 26 receptions for 334 receiving yards.

Fullback Larry Deco ranked second on the team with 249 rushing yards on 52 carries, an average of 4.8 yards per carry.

== Awards and honors ==
Senior halfback Earl Stoudt and senior end Art McGee were selected as the co-captains of the team.

Stoudt was selected as the Southern Conference's Player of the Year.

Stoudt and center Don Christman were selected as first-team players on the 1961 All-Southern Conference football team. End John Hilton and tackle Joe Teefey were named to the second team.

== Personnel ==
=== Players ===
- Tom Bondurant, guard, sophomore, 5'11", 210 pounds, Richmond, VA
- Don Christman, fullback/center, senior, 6'0", 215 pounds, North Hampton, PA
- Dick Curl, quarterback, senior, 6'0", 179 pounds, Chester, PA
- Jack/Ben Davis, guard, junior, 6'0", 200 pounds, Tappahannock, VA
- Larry Deco, fullback, sophomore, 6'0", 215 pounds, Avella, PA
- Bob Drobney, end, sophomore, 6'0", 180 pounds, Sharpsville, PA
- Jim Helvin, center, sophomore, 5'11", 175 pounds, Charlottesville, VA
- John Hilton, end, sophomore, 6'5", 210 pounds, Richmond, VA
- Bob Hodgson, halfback, sophomore, 5'10", 164 pounds, Charleroi, PA
- Joe Kessel, center/guard, sophomore, 5'10", 185 pounds, Wayne, NJ
- Bob Klinger, tackle, junior, 6'2", 218 pounds, Palmyra, PA
- Fred Mancuso, guard, sophomore, 6'3", 215 pounds, Pittsburgh, PA
- Art McGee, end and co-captain, senior, 6'0", 200 pounds, Baltimore, MD
- Al Mitchell, tackle, sophomore, 6'2", 217 pounds, Alexandria, VA
- Billy Nix, fullback, senior, 5'9", 190 pounds, Richmond, VA
- Tommy Peacock, fullback, sophomore, 5'10", 205 pounds, Bradenton, FL
- Stewart Percy, halfback, junior, 5'10", 165 pounds, Norristown, PA
- George Rapp, end, junior, 6'1", 183 pounds, Wayne, NJ
- Mel Rideout, quarterback, junior, 6'2", 200 pounds, Richmond, VA
- Steve Stevenson, halfback, junior, 5'10", 175 pounds, Richmond, VA
- Earl Stoudt, halfback and co-captain, senior, 5'9", 173 pounds, Lancaster, PA
- Joe Teefey, tackle, senior, 6'3", 223, Richmond, CA
- Don Thompson, tackle, senior, 6'4", 212 pounds, Danville, VA
- Brent Vann, halfback, junior, 6'0", 185 pounds, Franklin, VA
- Bill Ventura, end, junior, 6'6", 224 pounds, Garfield, NJ

=== Coaches ===
- Head coach: Ed Merrick
- Assistant coaches:
