= 1961 Furman Purple Hurricane football team =

American college football season

1961 Furman Purple Hurricane football
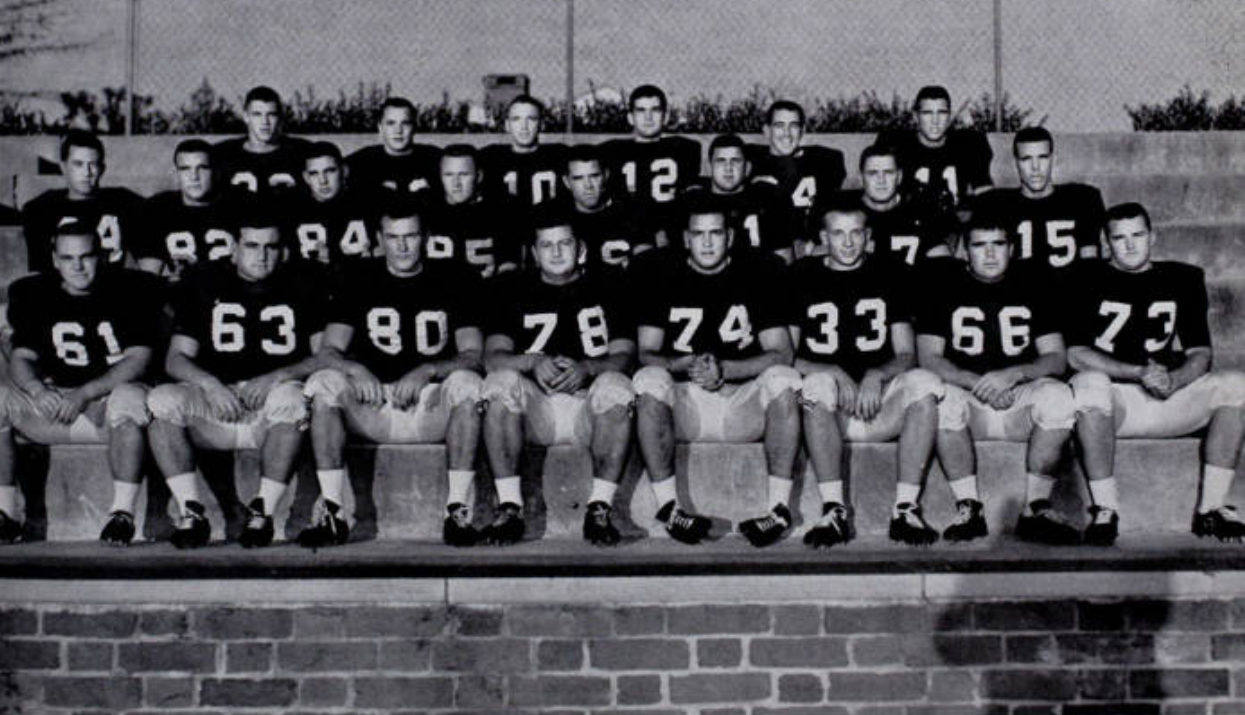
- Official team portrait
- Conference: Southern Conference
- Record: 7–3 (2–2 SoCon)
- Head coach: Bob King (4th season)
- MVP: Tony Carmignani
- Captains: Billy Canty; John Tew
- Home stadium: Sirrine Stadium

1961 Southern Conference football standings
	Conf.					Overall
Team	W		L		T	W		L		T
The Citadel $	5	–	1	–	0	7	–	3	–	0
Richmond	5	–	2	–	0	5	–	5	–	0
VMI	4	–	2	–	0	6	–	4	–	0
West Virginia	2	–	1	–	0	4	–	6	–	0
Furman	2	–	2	–	0	7	–	3	–	0
George Washington	3	–	4	–	0	3	–	6	–	0
Virginia Tech	2	–	3	–	0	4	–	5	–	0
Davidson	1	–	4	–	0	4	–	4	–	0
William & Mary	1	–	6	–	0	1	–	9	–	0
$ – Conference champion

The 1961 Furman Purple Hurricane football team was an American football team that represented Furman University as a member of the Southern Conference (SoCon) during the 1961 college football season. In their fourth season under head coach Bob King, Furman compiled a 7–3 record (2–2 in conference games), finished in fifth place in the SoCon, and outscored opponents by a total of 174 to 132.

The team's statistical leaders included quarterback Billy Canty (884 passing yards), fullback Tom Campbell (767 rushing yards), and halfback Tony Carmignani (247 passing yards). Carmignani was selected as the team's most valuable player.

The team played its home games at Sirrine Stadium in Greenville, South Carolina.

== Schedule ==
Date	Opponent	Site	Result	Attendance	Source
September 16	Presbyterian*	Sirrine Stadium; Greenville, SC	W 27–6	9,000	
September 23	Davidson	Sirrine Stadium; Greenville, SC	W 45–19	8,500	
September 30	George Washington	Sirrine Stadium; Greenville, SC	W 13–9	9,500	
October 7	at William & Mary	Cary Field; Williamsburg, VA	L 6–19	4,000	
October 14	Howard (AL)*	Sirrine Stadium; Greenville, SC	W 21–14	9,500	
October 21	at The Citadel	Johnson Hagood Stadium; Charleston, SC (rivalry)	L 8–9	16,200	
October 28	at Wofford*	Snyder Field; Spartanburg, SC (rivalry)	W 12–7		
November 4	at Memphis State*	Crump Stadium; Memphis, TN	W 7–6	6,036	
November 11	East Carolina*	Sirrine Stadium; Greenville, SC	W 29–8	12,000	
November 18	at Clemson*	Memorial Stadium; Clemson, SC	L 6–35	30,000	
*Non-conference game

== Statistics ==
Billy Canty completed 85 of 168 passes (50.6%) for 884 yards with eight touchdowns, 12 touchdowns, and a 96.2 quarterback rating. He ranked as the fifth leading passer nationally.

Tom Campbell was the team's leading rusher with 767 yards on 152 carries for an average of 5.0 yards per carry. He ranked eighth nationally in rushing yardage.

Tony Carmignani was the team's leading receiver with 27 receptions for 247 yards. He also tallied 319 rushing yards, second behind Campbell.

== Awards and honors ==
Quarterback Billy Canty and John Tew were the team's co-captains. Tony Carmignani was selected as the team's most valuable player.

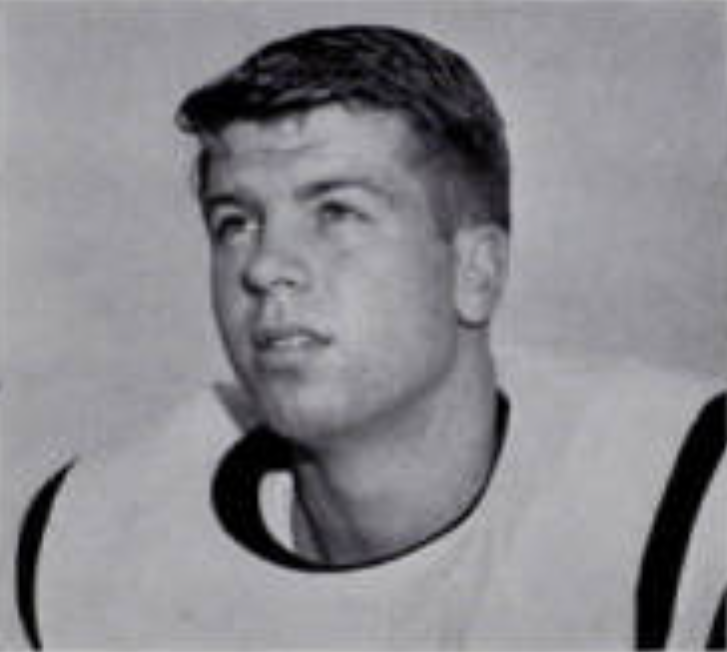
Halfback and MVP Tony Carmignani

Fullback Tom Campbell was named to the All-Southern Conference football team. Campbell finished second in voting for the Southern Conference Player of the Year. Billy Canty and Larry Jepson were named to the All-Southern Conference second team. Tony Carmignani and John Tew received honorable mention.

== Personnel ==
=== Players ===
- David Abercrombie, guard, junior
- Elton Brunty, quarterback, junior
- Tom Campbell, fullback
- Billy Canty, quarterback and co-captain, senior
- Tony Carmignani, halfback, senior
- Jim Chapin, guard, senior
- John Cook, halfback, sophomore
- Walter Crosby, halfback, sophomore
- Claude Davis, guard, senior
- Don Donovan, quarterback, sophomore
- Danny Ferguson, halfback, sophomore
- Ed Flynn, guard, sophomore
- Carroll Hartley, tackle, junior
- Hayden Hayes, end, sophomore
- Olin Hill, tackle, junior
- Larry Jepson, center, senior
- Elliott Keller, fullback, sophomore
- Ted Loth, halfback, senior
- Al Martin, end, junior
- Joe Monti, tackle, junior
- Bill Newman, end, senior
- Sam Pickens, halfback, sophomore
- Ken Richey, guard, sophomore
- Roger Senter, end, junior
- Jack Sharp, center, senior
- John Tew, guard/tackle and co-captain, senior
- Tom Walter, end, senior

=== Coaching staff ===
- Head coach: Bob King
- Assistant coaches: Bob Jennings, Bob Gongola, Dixie Howell, Johnny Menger, Vince Perone
