= 1963 William & Mary Indians football team =

American college football season

1963 William & Mary Indians football
- Conference: Southern Conference
- Record: 4–6 (4–4 SoCon)
- Head coach: Milt Drewer (7th season)
- Captain: Bob Soleau
- Home stadium: Cary Field

1963 Southern Conference football standings
	Conf.					Overall
Team	W		L		T	W		L		T
Virginia Tech $	5	–	0	–	0	8	–	2	–	0
West Virginia	3	–	1	–	0	4	–	6	–	0
VMI	3	–	1	–	2	3	–	5	–	2
Furman	3	–	2	–	0	7	–	3	–	0
William & Mary	4	–	4	–	0	4	–	6	–	0
Richmond	2	–	2	–	1	3	–	6	–	1
The Citadel	2	–	4	–	0	4	–	6	–	0
George Washington	1	–	5	–	0	2	–	7	–	0
Davidson	0	–	4	–	1	1	–	5	–	2
$ – Conference champion

The 1963 William & Mary Indians football team was an American football team that represented the College of William & Mary as a member of the Southern Conference (SoCon) during the 1963 NCAA University Division football season. In their seventh season under head coach Milt Drewer, William & Mary compiled a 4–6 record, with a mark of 4–4 in conference play, placing fifth in the SoCon.

== Schedule ==
Date	Opponent	Site	Result	Attendance	Source
September 21	at The Citadel	Johnson Hagood Stadium; Charleston, SC	W 7–0	11,500	
September 28	at No. 5 Navy*	Navy–Marine Corps Memorial Stadium; Annapolis, MD	L 0–28	19,230	
October 5	at Furman	Sirrine Stadium; Greenville, SC	W 27–17	6,000	
October 12	West Virginia	Cary Field; Williamsburg, VA	L 16–20	11,500	
October 19	at Virginia Tech	Miles Stadium; Blacksburg, VA	L 13–28	20,000	
October 26	George Washington	Cary Field; Williamsburg, VA	L 14–32	8,500	
November 2	VMI	Cary Field; Williamsburg, VA (rivalry)	L 6–26		
November 9	at Virginia*	Scott Stadium; Charlottesville, VA	L 7–9	16,000	
November 16	Davidson	Cary Field; Williamsburg, VA	W 34–5	4,000	
November 28	at Richmond	City Stadium; Richmond, VA (rivalry)	W 29–6	11,500	
*Non-conference game; Rankings from AP Poll released prior to the game

== NFL draft selections ==
= Pro Football Hall of Fame	= Canadian Football Hall of Fame	= College Football Hall of Fame

NFL Draft Selections

#	Year	Round	Pick	Overall	Name	Team	Position
1	1964	5	10	66	T. W. Alley	Pittsburgh Steelers	Tackle
2	1964	11	10	150	Bob Soleau	Pittsburgh Steelers	Guard
3	1964	12	2	156	John Sapinsky	Philadelphia Eagles	Tackle
