= 1961 West Virginia Mountaineers football team =

American college football season

1961 West Virginia Mountaineers football
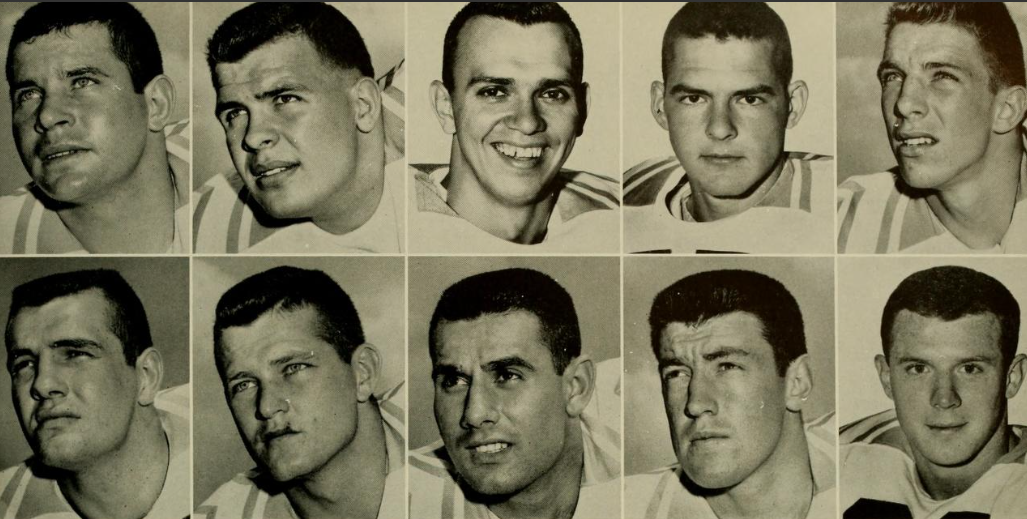
- First row: Fred Adkins, Glenn Bennett, Dale Evans, Vearl Haynes, Roger Holdinsky; Second row: Charles Martin, Dick Struck, Bob Timmerman, Bill Winter, Jay Yeardey
- Conference: Southern Conference
- Record: 4–6 (2–1 SoCon)
- Head coach: Gene Corum (2nd season)
- Home stadium: Mountaineer Field

1961 Southern Conference football standings
	Conf.					Overall
Team	W		L		T	W		L		T
The Citadel $	5	–	1	–	0	7	–	3	–	0
Richmond	5	–	2	–	0	5	–	5	–	0
VMI	4	–	2	–	0	6	–	4	–	0
West Virginia	2	–	1	–	0	4	–	6	–	0
Furman	2	–	2	–	0	7	–	3	–	0
George Washington	3	–	4	–	0	3	–	6	–	0
Virginia Tech	2	–	3	–	0	4	–	5	–	0
Davidson	1	–	4	–	0	4	–	4	–	0
William & Mary	1	–	6	–	0	1	–	9	–	0
$ – Conference champion

The 1961 West Virginia Mountaineers football team was an American football team that represented West Virginia University as a member of the Southern Conference (SoCon) during the 1961 college football season. In their second year under head coach Gene Corum, the Mountaineers compiled a 4–6 record (2–1 in conference games), tied for third place in the SoCon, and were outscored by a total of 145 to 134.

The team's statistical leaders included Fred Colvard (482 passing yards), Glenn Holton (372 rushing yards), and Steve Berzansky (116 receiving yards). Tackle Bill Winter and guard Keith Melenyzer were selected as first-team players on the 1961 All-Southern Conference football team.

The team played its home games at Mountaineer Field in Morgantown, West Virginia.

== Schedule ==
Date	Opponent	Site	Result	Attendance	Source
September 16	Richmond	Mountaineer Field; Morgantown, WV	L 26–35	12,000	
September 23	at Vanderbilt*	Dudley Field; Nashville, TN	L 6–16	18,000	
September 30	at No. 5 Syracuse*	Archbold Stadium; Syracuse, NY (rivalry)	L 14–29	25,000	
October 7	Virginia Tech	Mountaineer Field; Morgantown, WV (rivalry)	W 28–0	15,000	
October 14	at Pittsburgh*	Pitt Stadium; Pittsburgh, PA (rivalry)	W 20–6	28,450	
October 21	at Boston University*	Boston University Field; Boston, MA	L 6–12	7,100	
October 28	at Army*	Michie Stadium; West Point, NY	W 7–3	23,525	
November 4	at George Washington	District of Columbia Stadium; Washington, DC	W 12–7	9,395	
November 11	Penn State*	Mountaineer Field; Morgantown, WV (rivalry)	L 6–20	30,000	
November 18	Indiana*	Mountaineer Field; Morgantown, WV	L 9–17	15,000	
*Non-conference game; Rankings from AP Poll released prior to the game

== Statistics ==
The Mountaineers gained an average of 175.8 rushing yards and 62.4 passing yards per game. On defense, they gave up an average of 166.7 rushing yards per game and 83.8 passing yards per game.

Quarterback Fred Colvard completed 31 of 71 passes (43.7%) for 482 yards with three touchdowns, three interceptions, and a 106.2 quarterback rating. Backup Dale Evans completed only nine of 27 passes (33.3%) for 135 yards.

The team's leading rushers were Glenn Holton (372 yards, 79 carries, 4.7-yard average), Jim Moss (342 yards, 63 carries, 5.3-yard average), Tom Woodeshick (337 yards, 68 carries, 5.0-yard average), and Steve Berzansky (233 yards, 61 carries, 3.8-yard average).

The leading receivers were Steve Berzansky (10 receptions, 116 yards) and Dick Struck (five receptions, 112 yards).

== Awards and honors ==
Two West Virginia players received first-team honors from the Associated Press (AP) on the 1961 All-Southern Conference football team: tackle Bill Winter and guard Keith Melenyzer. Back Glenn Holton was named to the second team. End Ken Herock, guard Bob De Lorenzo, center Pete Goimarac, and backs Fred Colvard, Jim Moss, and Roger Holdinsky received honorable mention.

== Personnel ==
=== Players ===
- Fred Adkins
- Glenn Bennett
- Dale Evans
- Vearl Haynes
- Roger Holdinsky
- Charles Martin
- Dick Struck
- Bob Timmerman
- Bill Winter
- Jay Yeardley

=== Coaching staff ===
- Head coach: Gene Corum
- Assistant coach: Jimmy Walthall, Ray Watson, Dick Ware, Ed Shockey, Charles Donaldson, Russ Crane
