= Milt Drewer =

American football coach and administrator (1923–2012)

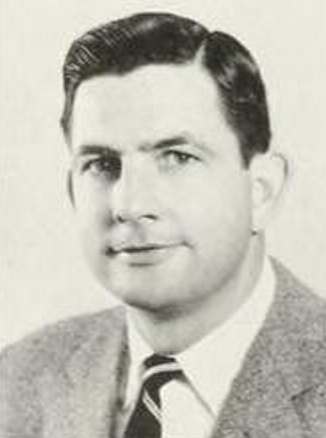
- Drewer pictured in Colonial Echo 1959, William & Mary yearbook

Biographical details
- Born: March 10, 1923; Saxis, Virginia, U.S.
- Died: October 17, 2012 (aged 89); Arlington, Virginia, U.S.

Coaching career (HC unless noted)
- 1952–1955: Warwick HS (VA)
- 1956: Richmond (assistant)
- 1957–1963: William & Mary

Administrative career (AD unless noted)
- 1957–1963: William & Mary

Head coaching record
- Overall: 21–46–2 (college)

Milton L. Drewer Jr. (March 10, 1923 – October 17, 2012) was an American football coach and college athletics administrator. He served as the head football coach and athletic director at the College of William & Mary from 1957 to 1963. His William & Mary Indians football teams compiled a 21–46–2 record.

After leaving William & Mary, Drewer went on to a career in banking. He eventually became CEO of First American Bank of Virginia. Drewer died on October 17, 2012.

== Head coaching record ==
=== College ===
Year	Team	Overall	Conference	Standing	Bowl/playoffs
William & Mary Indians (Southern Conference) (1957–1963)
1957	William & Mary	4–6	2–4	T–4th	
1958	William & Mary	2–6–1	1–4–1	9th	
1959	William & Mary	4–6	2–5	7th	
1960	William & Mary	2–8	1–5	8th	
1961	William & Mary	1–9	1–6	9th	
1962	William & Mary	4–5–1	4–3–1	4th	
1963	William & Mary	4–6	4–4	T–5th	
William & Mary:		21–46–2	15–31–2		
Total:		21–46–2			
