= 1961 Davidson Wildcats football team =

American college football season

1961 Davidson Wildcats football
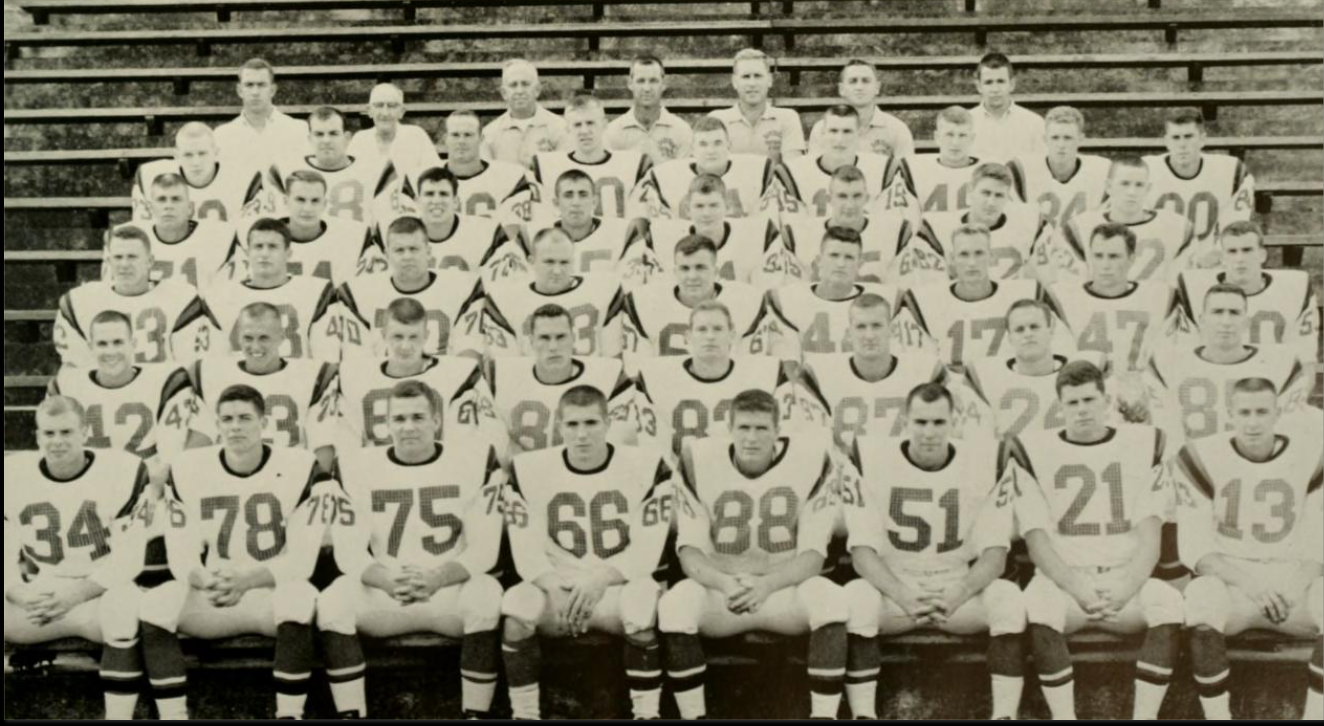
- Conference: Southern Conference
- Record: 4–4 (1–4 SoCon)
- Head coach: Bill Dole (10th season)
- Home stadium: Richardson Stadium

1961 Southern Conference football standings
	Conf.					Overall
Team	W		L		T	W		L		T
The Citadel $	5	–	1	–	0	7	–	3	–	0
Richmond	5	–	2	–	0	5	–	5	–	0
VMI	4	–	2	–	0	6	–	4	–	0
West Virginia	2	–	1	–	0	4	–	6	–	0
Furman	2	–	2	–	0	7	–	3	–	0
George Washington	3	–	4	–	0	3	–	6	–	0
Virginia Tech	2	–	3	–	0	4	–	5	–	0
Davidson	1	–	4	–	0	4	–	4	–	0
William & Mary	1	–	6	–	0	1	–	9	–	0
$ – Conference champion

The 1961 Davidson Wildcats football team was an American football team that represented Davidson College as a member of the Southern Conference (SoCon) during the 1961 college football season. In their tenth year under head coach Bill Dole, the Wildcats compiled a 4–4 record (1–4 in conference game), finished in eighth place in the SoCon, and were outscored by a total of 163 to 138.

Quarterback Earl Cole led the team with 759 passing yards and nine touchdown passes.

The team played its home games at Richardson Stadium in Davidson, North Carolina.

== Schedule ==
Date	Opponent	Site	Result	Attendance	Source
September 16	vs. Catawba*	American Legion Memorial Stadium; Charlotte, NC	W 21–15		
September 23	at Furman	Sirrine Stadium; Greenville, SC	L 19–45	8,500	
September 30	at The Citadel	Johnson Hagood Stadium; Charleston, SC	L 12–20		
October 14	Presbyterian*	Richardson Stadium; Davidson, NC	W 21–7	6,500	
October 21	VMI	Richardson Stadium; Davidson, NC	L 0–13		
October 28	at Richmond	City Stadium; Richmond, VA	L 0–20	3,000	
November 4	at William & Mary	Cary Field; Williamsburg, VA	W 31–30		
November 11	Wofford*	Richardson Stadium; Davidson, NC	W 34–13	5,500	
*Non-conference game

== Statistics ==
The Wildcats tallied an average of 157.0 rushing yards and 114.5 passing yards per game. On defense, they gained 149.1 rushing yards and 127.5 passing yards per game.

Quarterback Earl Cole completed 56 of 136 passes (41.2%) for 758 yards with nine touchdowns, five interceptions and a 102.5 quarterback rating. Backup quarterback Ben Coxton completed seven of 16 passes for 119 yards.

The team had five backs with at least 100 rushing yards: Alex Gibbs (259 yards, 58 carries, 4.5-yard average), Jim Fuller (204 yards, 55 carries, 3.7-yard average), Jerry Sheffield (165 yards, 16 carries, 10.3-yard average), Joe Jones (126 yards, 39 carries, 3.2-yard average), and Dave Lopp (116 yards, 21 carries, 5.5-yard average).

The team's passing leaders were Jerry Sheffield (11 receptions, 194 yards), Alex Gibbs (14 receptions, 176 yards), Lou Zirkle (13 receptions, 167 yards), and Booker Clarke (nine receptions, 139 yards).

== Awards and honors ==
End Booker Clark received honorable mention on the 1961 All-Southern Conference football team.

== Personnel ==
=== Players ===
- Booker Clark, end, senior, 6'1", 164 pounds, Statesville, NC
- Earl Cole, quarterback, sophomore, 5'11", 166 pounds, Wilmington, NC
- Ben Coxton, quarterback, sophomore, 6'0", 190 pounds, Garden, VA,
- Jim Fuller, halfback, junior, 6'0", 205 pounds, Thomasville, NC
- Alex Gibbs, halfback, sophomore, 5'9", 170 pounds, High Point, NC
- Joe Jones, halfback, sophomore, 5'9", 168 pounds, High Point, NC
- Dave Lopp, halfback, sophomore, 5'9", 164 pounds, Lexington, NC
- Lynwood Mallard, fullback, senior, 5'10", 184 pounds, Charlotte, NC
- Bob McAllister, fullback, senior, 6'0", 195 pounds, Staunton, VA
- Duncan Morgan/Morton, halfback, senior, 6'0", 162 pounds, Charlotte, NC
- Jerry Sheffield, end, sophomore, 6'1", 190 pounds, Winston-Salem, NC
- Lou Zirkle, end, sophomore, 6'2", 164 pounds, Conway, SC

=== Coaching staff ===
- Head coach: Bill Dole
- Assistant coaches: Thrift, Stevens, Shue
