= 1963 Virginia Tech Gobblers football team =

American college football season

1963 Virginia Tech Gobblers football

SoCon champion
- Conference: Southern Conference
- Record: 8–2 (5–0 SoCon)
- Head coach: Jerry Claiborne (3rd season)
- Home stadium: Miles Stadium

1963 Southern Conference football standings
	Conf.					Overall
Team	W		L		T	W		L		T
Virginia Tech $	5	–	0	–	0	8	–	2	–	0
West Virginia	3	–	1	–	0	4	–	6	–	0
VMI	3	–	1	–	2	3	–	5	–	2
Furman	3	–	2	–	0	7	–	3	–	0
William & Mary	4	–	4	–	0	4	–	6	–	0
Richmond	2	–	2	–	1	3	–	6	–	1
The Citadel	2	–	4	–	0	4	–	6	–	0
George Washington	1	–	5	–	0	2	–	7	–	0
Davidson	0	–	4	–	1	1	–	5	–	2
$ – Conference champion

The 1963 Virginia Tech Gobblers football team represented the Virginia Polytechnic Institute—now known as Virginia Tech—as a member of the Southern Conference (SoCon) during the 1963 NCAA University Division football season. Led by third-year head coach Jerry Claiborne, the Gobblers compiled an overall record of 8–2 with a mark of 5–0 in conference play, winning the SoCon title. It was the program's only conference championship during its time as a member of the SoCon, which ran from 1922 to 1964.

Bob Schweickert, the team's dual-threat quarterback, passed for 687 yards and six touchdowns, and ran for 839 yards and scored seven TD's. Sonny Utz was the team's scoring leader, rushing for 567 yards and scoring 10 touchdowns.

Schweickert was named to the third-team of the 1963 College Football All-America Team by the Associated Press. He was also honored as the Southern Conference Player of the Year as voted by the media. The media did not vote for an all Southern Conference team, but did vote on an all-star team selected from the five Division I teams that played in the commonwealth of Virginia at the time. Schweickert was joined on the first time by Utz, end Jake Adams, and guard Newt Green. The second team included tackle Gene Breen and center Burton Mack Rodgers. Tommy Marvin made the honorable mention team at end. (Note: All-star teams were not broken down by offense and defense at the time.)

Tech was never ranked in national polls, losing its first game of the year to Kentucky, which ended the year 3–6–1. The team's three non-conference wins came against ACC foes Virginia (2–7–1), Florida State (4–5–1), and Wake Forest (1–9). Tech's other loss came late in the year against NC State, which was the only non-conference opponent that had a winning record (8–3).

== Schedule ==
Date	Time	Opponent	Site	Result	Attendance	Source
September 21		at Kentucky*	Stoll Field/McLean Stadium; Lexington, KY	L 14–33	35,000	
September 28		at Wake Forest*	Bowman Gray Stadium; Winston-Salem, NC	W 27–0	7,000	
October 5	2:30 p.m.	vs. Virginia*	Victory Stadium; Roanoke, VA (Harvest Bowl, rivalry)	W 10–0	20,000	
October 11	8:00 p.m.	at George Washington	District of Columbia Stadium; Washington, DC	W 22–8	7,000	
October 19		William & Mary^{†}	Miles Stadium; Blacksburg, VA	W 28–13	20,000	
October 26		at Florida State*	Doak Campbell Stadium; Tallahassee, FL	W 31–23	16,500	
November 2		at Richmond	City Stadium; Richmond, VA	W 14–13	18,000	
November 9		at NC State*	Riddick Stadium; Raleigh, NC	L 7–13	20,500	
November 16		at West Virginia	Old Mountaineer Field; Morgantown, WV (rivalry)	W 28–3	15,000	
November 28	1:30 p.m.	vs. VMI	Victory Stadium; Roanoke, VA (rivalry)	W 35–20	27,000	
*Non-conference game; ^{†}Homecoming

== Game summaries ==
=== Virginia ===
Tech scored 10 first quarter points in the annual Harvest Bowl in Roanoke, and hung on for a 10-0 shutout. Sonny Utz scored the only touchdown on a two-yard carry following a fumbled punt that put the Gobblers on the Cavalier's doorstep. Dickie Cranwell booted a 40-yard field goal for the other Tech points. UVA had two chances to score inside the Tech 15 in the second half, but the defense held on both occasions. Bob Schweickert ran 63 yards on 16 carries and had 91 passing yards on a 7-14 day.

=== West Virginia ===
Virginia Tech perfectly executed an on-side kick on the game's opening kickoff and never looked back in a 28-3 rout of West Virginia. The game, played in Morgantown, was essentially a semi-final for the Southern Conference championship, as the Mountaineers and Gobblers both entered the game with an undefeated league record. Bob Schweickert was 13 of 16 through the air amassing 114 yards, and ran 43 yards on 13 carriers. He threw a seven yard touchdown pass to Jake Adams. Sonny Utz had two one-yard TD's and Bobby Owens picked up a Tech fumble at the WVU one and took it in for the final score of the day. The defense was superb in bending without a break. The Gobblers "D" gave up only three points even though the Mountaineers reached the 30, 1, 9, 18, 6 and 5 five yard lines.

=== VMI ===
A capacity crowd of 27,750 filled Victory Stadium in Roanoke for the annual Thanksgiving Day contest between VMI and Virginia Tech, this time for the Southern Conference championship. VMI came into the game on a 12-game unbeaten conference streak and was attempting to defend its conference championship from the previous year. It had won four of the previous six league crowns (in 1957, 1959, 1960, and 1962). VMI had been tied twice during the year and entered the game with a 3-0-2 record. The Gobblers were 4-0 and had defeated third-place West Virginia, so only the two old rivals could end the season with an undefeated league mark.

With the score tied 14-14 early in the third period, VMI drove 68 yards to inches of the Tech end zone. Sonny Utz and Tommy Hawkins, members of the Tech offensive backfield playing both ways, made a joint tackle on fourth down inside the one to keep the score knotted. The stingy VMI defense held, and put the Gobblers into a punting situation. Tech's Bob's Schweickert, quarterback and punter, booted a 58-yarder to flip the field. Utz recovered a VMI fumble two players later, and Schweickert took the next snap himself, running 41-yards to the Keydet seven. The following play, he passed to Jake Edwards to give the team its first lead of the day. Less than three minutes later, Schweickert, returned a punt for the first time in his career, spectacularly scoring on an 82-yard jaunt to put Tech up by two scores. Tech made it a 35-14 lead after Utz ran three yards to capitalize on an interception in VMI territory. VMI blocked a Tech punt into the endzone, but failed to capitalize on the two-point conversion, to make the final 35-20.

Both of Tech's first half scores came by Tommy Walker. He caught a Schweickert pass for a 34-yard touchdown to bring the score to make it a 7-7 tie, and then set a school record with a 99-yard kickoff return to make it 14-14 at halftime. Walker was married the following day.

The offensive statistics, ones that don't count punt or kickoff return, were all in favor of VMI. The Keydets had 22 first downs to six for Tech, and outgained the Gobblers 417 to 176.

== Roster ==
The following players were members of the 1963 football team according to the roster published in the 1964 edition of The Bugle, the Virginia Tech yearbook.

VPI 1963 roster
Jake Adams; Kyle Marlon Albright; William McLemore Babb, Jr.; Darryl Bailey; Joe Bloomer; Gene Breen; Mike Cahill; Alex Camaioni; Phillip W. Cary; Robert Carr Churchill; Paul Frederick Cobb; Dickie Cranwell; Bill Edwards; Lacy Lee Edwards, Jr.; Ronald Wayne Frank; David Green; Walter Newton Green, Jr.	Les Hanly; Thomas Morgan Hawkins; Wayne Hewitt; James Venable Hickam; Tom Hidell; Wynston Holbrook; Michael Joseph Hvozdovic; Ed Jeffrey; Basil G. Jennings; Lynn Jones; Bill Kegley; Dickie Kelly; Victor "Vic" William Kreiter, Jr.; Harry Leland; Ronnie Lindon; Tommy Marvin; Claude Earl Messamore, Jr.	Bobby Owens; Darrell Page; Larry Philpot; John Raible; Douglas Bradley Robbins; Burt Mack Rodgers; Fred Michael Saunders; Bob Schweickert; John Sheehy; John George Shipley; James Simmons; Douglas Lee Ulery; Silas Alexander "Sonny" Utz, III; Joseph Gilleece "Skip" Vance; Thomas Merritt Walker; K. T. "Buddy" Weihe; Ken Whitley
