= 1963 George Washington Colonials football team =

American college football season

1963 George Washington Colonials football
- Conference: Southern Conference
- Record: 2–7 (1–5 SoCon)
- Head coach: Jim Camp (3rd season)
- Home stadium: District of Columbia Stadium

1963 Southern Conference football standings
	Conf.					Overall
Team	W		L		T	W		L		T
Virginia Tech $	5	–	0	–	0	8	–	2	–	0
West Virginia	3	–	1	–	0	4	–	6	–	0
VMI	3	–	1	–	2	3	–	5	–	2
Furman	3	–	2	–	0	7	–	3	–	0
William & Mary	4	–	4	–	0	4	–	6	–	0
Richmond	2	–	2	–	1	3	–	6	–	1
The Citadel	2	–	4	–	0	4	–	6	–	0
George Washington	1	–	5	–	0	2	–	7	–	0
Davidson	0	–	4	–	1	1	–	5	–	2
$ – Conference champion

The 1963 George Washington Colonials football team was an American football team that represented George Washington University as part of the Southern Conference during the 1963 NCAA University Division football season. In its third season under head coach Jim Camp, the team compiled a 2–7 record (1–5 in the SoCon).

== Schedule ==
Date	Opponent	Site	Result	Attendance	Source
September 21	at VMI	Alumni Memorial Field; Lexington, VA	L 6–14	6,500	
September 28	at Furman	Sirrine Stadium; Greenville, SC	L 14–29	1,200	
October 4	The Citadel	District of Columbia Stadium; Washington, DC	L 22–27	6,100	
October 11	Virginia Tech	District of Columbia Stadium; Washington, DC	L 8–22	7,000	
October 19	at Villanova*	Villanova Stadium; Villanova, PA	L 13–14	11,000	
October 26	at William & Mary	Cary Field; Williamsburg, VA	W 32–14	8,500	
November 2	West Virginia	District of Columbia Stadium; Washington, DC	L 16–20	8,000	
November 9	BYU*	District of Columbia Stadium; Washington, DC	W 23–6	7,000	
November 23	at Vanderbilt*	Dudley Field; Nashville, TN	L 0–31	11,000	
*Non-conference game
