= 1974 Big Ten Conference football season =

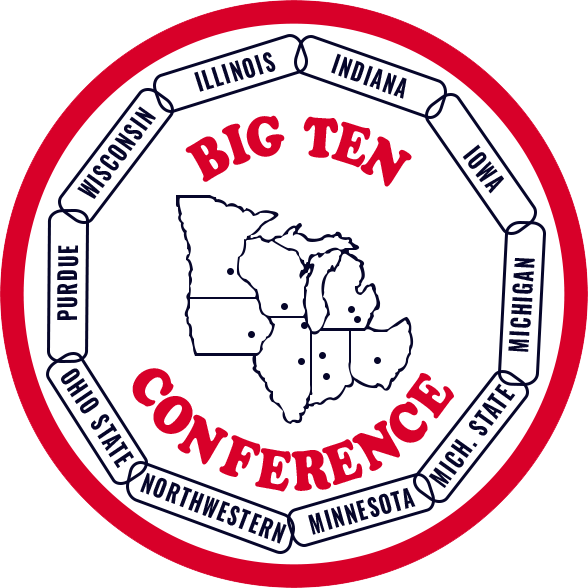
- Sport: American football
- Teams: 10
- Top draft pick: Larry Burton
- Co-champions: Michigan, Ohio State
- Runners-up: Michigan State
- Season MVP: Archie Griffin

Seasons
- 1973 1975

1974 Big Ten Conference football standings
	Conf.					Overall
Team	W		L		T	W		L		T
No. 3 Michigan +	7	–	1	–	0	10	–	1	–	0
No. 4 Ohio State +	7	–	1	–	0	10	–	2	–	0
No. 12 Michigan State	6	–	1	–	1	7	–	3	–	1
Wisconsin	5	–	3	–	0	7	–	4	–	0
Illinois	4	–	3	–	1	6	–	4	–	1
Purdue	3	–	5	–	0	4	–	6	–	1
Minnesota	2	–	6	–	0	4	–	7	–	0
Iowa	2	–	6	–	0	3	–	8	–	0
Northwestern	2	–	6	–	0	3	–	8	–	0
Indiana	1	–	7	–	0	1	–	10	–	0
+ – Conference co-champions; Rankings from AP Poll

The 1974 Big Ten Conference football season was the 79th season of college football played by the member schools of the Big Ten Conference and was a part of the 1974 NCAA Division I football season.

The 1974 Michigan Wolverines football team, under head coach Bo Schembechler, compiled a 10–1 record, tied for the Big Ten championship, led the conference in scoring defense (6.8 points allowed per game), and was ranked No. 3 in final AP Poll. Cornerback Dave Brown was selected a consensus first-team All-American for the second straight year. Gordon Bell led the team with 1,048 rushing yards and 11 touchdowns. Quarterback Dennis Franklin finished sixth in the voting for the Heisman Trophy.

The 1974 Ohio State Buckeyes football team, under head coach Woody Hayes, compiled a 10–2 record, tied with Michigan for the Big Ten championship, led the conference in scoring offense (36.4 points per game), and was ranked No. 4 in the final AP Poll. The Buckeyes lost to USC, 18–17, in the 1975 Rose Bowl. Running back Archie Griffin totaled 1,695 rushing yards and won the 1974 Heisman Trophy as the best player in college football. Three Buckeyes, Griffin, Kurt Schumacher, and Steve Myers, were selected as consensus first-team All-Americans.

The 1974 Michigan State Spartans football team, under head coach Denny Stolz, compiled a 7–3–1 record, finished in third place in the Big Ten, and was ranked No. 12 in the final AP Poll. Quarterback Charley Baggett was selected as the team's most valuable player.

== Season overview ==
=== Results and team statistics ===
Conf. Rank	Team	Head coach	AP final	AP high	Overall record	Conf. record	PPG	PAG	MVP
1 (tie)	Michigan	Bo Schembechler	#3	#3	10–1	7–1	29.5	**6.8**	Steve Strinko
1 (tie)	Ohio State	Woody Hayes	#4	#1	10–2	7–1	**36.4**	10.8	**Archie Griffin**
3	Michigan State	Denny Stolz	#12	#12	7–3–1	6–1–1	24.5	17.8	Charley Baggett
4	Wisconsin	John Jardine	NR	#11	7–4	5–3	31.0	22.1	Gregg Bohlig
5	Illinois	Bob Blackman	NR	#14	6–4–1	4–3–1	19.1	18.7	Tom Hicks
6	Purdue	Alex Agase	NR	NR	4–6–1	3–5	20.3	23.7	Larry Burton
7 (tie)	Minnesota	Cal Stoll	NR	NR	4–7	2–6	14.6	30.2	Ollie Bakken
7 (tie)	Iowa	Bob Commings	NR	NR	3–8	2–6	14.3	28.0	Rob Fick
7 (tie)	Northwestern	John Pont	NR	NR	3–8	2–6	12.7	35.0	Paul Hiemenz
10	Indiana	Lee Corso	NR	NR	1–10	1–7	15.1	26.5	Donnie Thomas

Key
AP final = Team's rank in the final AP Poll of the 1974 season
AP high = Team's highest rank in the AP Poll throughout the 1974 season
PPG = Average of points scored per game; conference leader's average displayed in bold
PAG = Average of points allowed per game; conference leader's average displayed in bold
MVP = Most valuable player as voted by players on each team as part of the voting process to determine the winner of the Chicago Tribune Silver Football trophy; trophy winner in bold

=== Pre-season ===
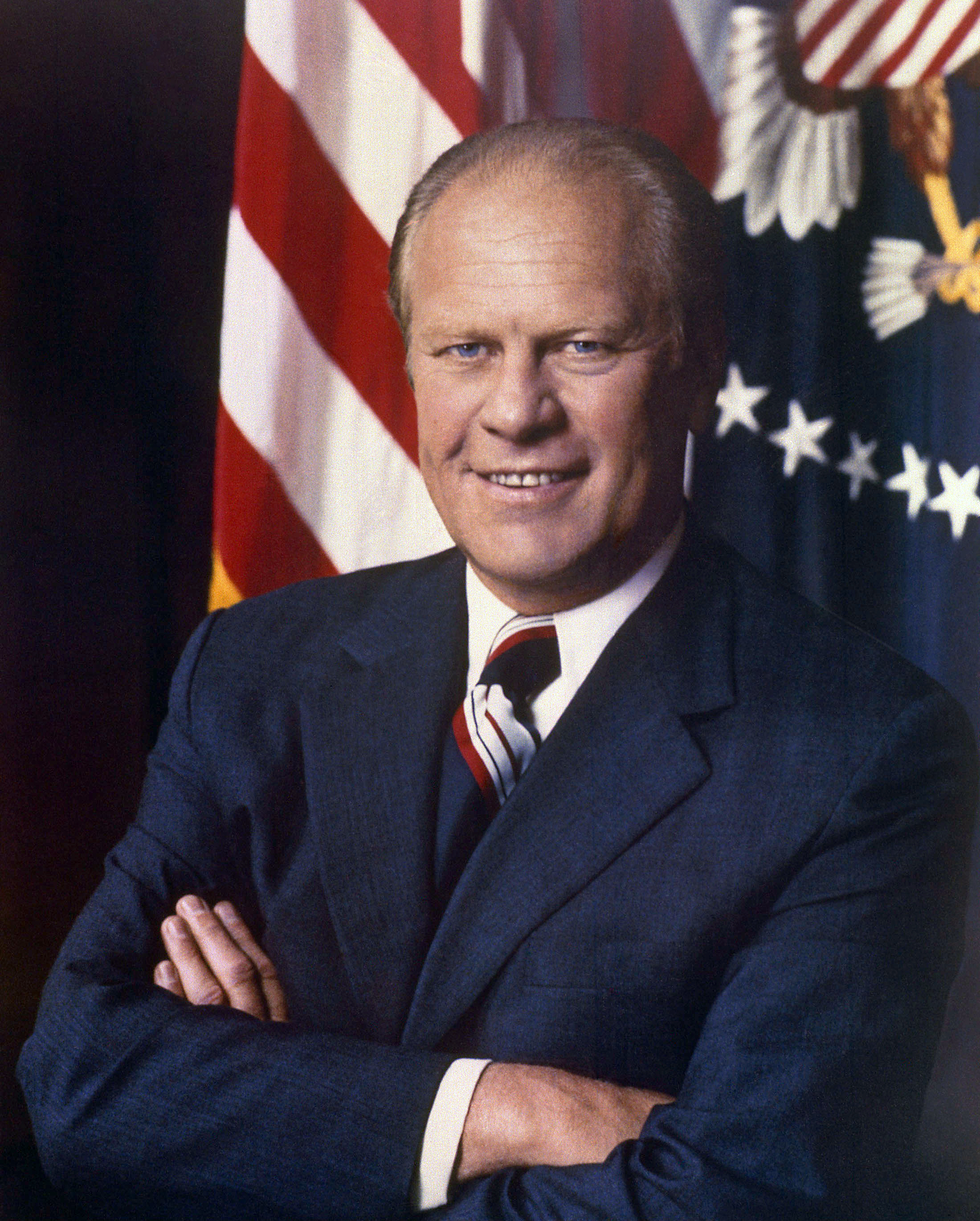
Former Michigan star Gerald Ford ascended to the presidency in August 1974.

In December 1973, former Michigan football player Gerald Ford was appointed as Vice President of the United States; he ascended to the Presidency in August 1974. Ford drew attention to the Michigan football program as he often had the Naval band play the University of Michigan fight song, The Victors, before state events instead of Hail to the Chief. During Ford's first foreign trip as president in November 1974, Emperor Hirohito of Japan greeted Ford with a military band playing The Victors.

=== Regular season ===
==== September 14 ====
On September 14, 1974, the Big Ten football teams opened the season with five conference games.

- Ohio State 34, Minnesota 19.
- Michigan 24, Iowa 7. Michigan defeated Iowa, 24–7. Michigan rushed for 315 yards in the game, led by Rob Lytle (86 yards on 14 carries). Michigan quarterback Dennis Franklin did not appear in the game due to illness and was replaced by Mark Elzinga, who completed 2 of 11 passes for 34 yards. One of Elzinga's two completions was caught by Gil Chapman for a touchdown in the third quarter. Elzinga also ran one yard for Michigan's second touchdown in the first quarter. Iowa's only touchdown was scored in the final minute of the fourth quarter.
- Michigan State 41, Northwestern 7.
- Wisconsin 28, Purdue 14.
- Illinois 16, Indiana 0.

==== September 21 ====
On September 21, 1974, the Big Ten teams played 10 non-conference games, resulting in seven wins, two losses, and one tie.

- Ohio State 51, Oregon State 10.
- Michigan 31, Colorado 0. Michigan defeated Colorado, 31 to 0, before a crowd of 91,203 at Michigan Stadium. The game matched head coaches Bo Schembechler and Bill Mallory, both of whom had coached under Woody Hayes at Ohio State. Two minutes into the game, Michigan's Dave Brown returned a punt 88 yards for a touchdown. After being discharged from the hospital four days before the game, quarterback Dennis Franklin completed 11 of 16 passes for 115 yards and a touchdown and no interceptions. Franklin also rushed for 69 yards on 13 carries and scored a touchdown in the second quarter after recovering Rob Lytle's fumble in the end zone. After the game, head coach Bo Schembechler said, "I told you guys he was a decent quarterback didn't I? And this was after only three days of practice after lying on his back for 10 days. I thought his performance was remarkable. Why, it was almost an aerial circus!" Michigan's defense held Colorado to 44 rushing yards on 30 carries.
- Michigan State 19, Syracuse 0
- Wisconsin 21, Nebraska 20
- Illinois 41, Stanford 7
- Miami (OH) 7, Purdue 7
- Minnesota 42, North Dakota 30
- Iowa 21, UCLA 10
- Notre Dame 49, Northwestern 3
- Arizona 35, Indiana 20

==== September 28 ====
On September 28, 1974, the Big Ten teams played 10 non-conference games, resulting in five wins and five losses.

- Ohio State 28, SMU 9.
- Michigan 52, Navy 0. Michigan defeated Navy, 52–0, before a crowd of 104,232 at Michigan Stadium. Michigan's backs dominated, rushing for 340 yards and six touchdowns on 67 carries. Gordon Bell rushed for 57 yards and three touchdowns on nine carries, Chuck Heater gained 61 yards and two on 13 carries, and Rob Lytle rushed for 101 yards and a touchdown on 15 carries. Dennis Franklin completed five of six passes for 85 yards, including a 29-yard touchdown pass to Jim Smith in the third quarter.
- UCLA 56, Michigan State 14
- Colorado 24, Wisconsin 21
- Illinois 21, Washington State 19
- Purdue 31, Notre Dame 20
- Minnesota 9, TCU 7
- Penn State 27, Iowa 0
- Nebraska 49, Northwestern 7
- Kentucky 28, Indiana 22

==== October 5 ====
On October 5, 1974, the Big Ten teams played 10 non-conference games, resulting in four wins and six losses. After concluding three weeks of non-conference play, the Big Ten teams had compiled a 16–13–1 non-conference record.

- Ohio State 42, Washington State 7.
- Michigan 27, Stanford 16. Michigan defeated Stanford, 27–16, at Stanford Stadium. Stanford took a 9–6 lead at halftime as Mike Langford kicked three field goals, and the Stanford defense did not allow a first down during the first quarter. In the second quarter, Gordon Bell scored on a one-yard run, but the kick for extra point failed. Also in the second quarter, Stanford intercepted a pass by Dennis Franklin, marking Michigan's first turnover in 255 plays during the 1974 season. In the third quarter, Franklin rushed for two touchdowns to give Michigan a 20–9 lead. The teams traded touchdowns in the fourth quarter, including a two-yard run by Michigan backup Scott Corbin. Stanford quarterback Jerry Waldvogel completed 21 of 40 passes and 229 yards. The Wolverines rushed for 317 yards on 66 carries, including 96 yards for Rob Lytle.
- Notre Dame 19, Michigan State 14
- Wisconsin 59, Missouri 20
- California 31, Illinois 14
- Duke 16, Purdue 14
- Nebraska 54, Minnesota 0
- USC 41, Iowa 3
- Northwestern 14, Oregon 10
- West Virginia 24, Indiana 0

==== October 12 ====
On October 12, 1974, the Big Ten teams played five conference games.

- Ohio State 52, Wisconsin 7.
- Michigan 21, Michigan State 7. Michigan defeated Michigan State, 21–7. The game, played at Michigan Stadium, attracted a crowd of 104,682, reported to be "the second largest crowd in modern N.C.A.A. history" behind the 1973 Michigan-Ohio State game. Gordon Bell led Michigan's rushing attack with 73 yards on 16 carries, including a 13-yard touchdown run in the first quarter. Linebacker Dan Jilek scored in the second quarter when he forced a fumble on a punt attempt and then recovered it in the end zone.
- Illinois 27, Purdue 23
- Indiana 34, Minnesota 3
- Iowa 35, Northwestern 10

==== October 19 ====
On October 19, 1974, the Big Ten teams played five conference games.

- Ohio State 49, Indiana 9.
- Michigan 24, Wisconsin 20. Michigan defeated Wisconsin, 24–20, before a record crowd of 78,911 at Camp Randall Stadium in Madison, Wisconsin. Michigan gained 265 rushing yards led by Chuck Heater who had 101 yards on 20 carries and a 22-yard touchdown run in the second quarter. Michigan gave up 206 rushing yards to Wisconsin, prompting coach Schembechler to say, "That's the most anyone has run on us in years. I was surprised they could do that well against us, but their offense is very, very good."
- Illinois 21, Michigan State 21.
- Purdue 31, Northwestern 26.
- Minnesota 23, Iowa 17.

==== October 26 ====
On October 26, 1974, the Big Ten teams played five conference games.

- Ohio State 55, Northwestern 7.
- Michigan 49, Minnesota 0. Michigan defeated Minnesota, 49–0, before a crowd of 96,284 at Michigan Stadium. Michigan rolled to over 600 yards in the game. On the ground, the Wolverines totaled 521 rushing yards, led by Rob Lytle (158 yards on 20 carries) and Gordon Bell (134 yards and a touchdown on 17 carries). Gil Chapman gained 41 yards and scored two touchdowns on six carries. Dennis Franklin completed six of seven passes for 99 yards, including a 22-yard touchdown pass to Jim Smith in the third quarter.
- Michigan State 31, Purdue 7.
- Wisconsin 35, Indiana 25.
- Iowa 14, Illinois 12.

==== November 2 ====
On November 2, 1974, the Big Ten teams played five conference games.

- Ohio State 49, Illinois 7.
- Michigan 21, Indiana 7. Michigan defeated Indiana, 21–7, at Memorial Stadium in Bloomington, Indiana. After Gordon Bell returned the opening kickoff to the 45-yard line, Michigan drove to Indiana's 13-yard line, but Rob Lytle's fumble ended the drive. In all, the Wolverines turned the ball over three times, twice on fumbles by Lytle and once on an interception of a Dennis Franklin pass. Neither team scored in the first quarter, but Gordon Bell ran for two touchdowns in the second quarter to give Michigan a 14–0 lead at halftime. Michigan totaled 344 rushing yards in the game with Bell gaining 159 yards on 23 carries. Indiana scored in the fourth quarter to cut Michigan's lead to seven points, but Gil Chapman scored with 36 seconds remaining in the game to extend the score to 21–7.
- Michigan State 28, Wisconsin 21.
- Purdue 38, Iowa 14.
- Northwestern 21, Minnesota 13.

==== November 9 ====
On November 9, 1974, the Big Ten teams played five conference games.

- Michigan State 16, Ohio State 13.
- Michigan 14, Illinois 6. Michigan defeated Illinois, 14–6, at Memorial Stadium in Champaign, Illinois. The Illini played the game in mourning as 20-year-old defensive end Greg Williams was fatally shot at 2:30 a.m. during an altercation at a fraternity party and died eight hours later on the morning of the game. Michigan dominated the first half, scoring twice on runs by Gordon Bell and Dennis Franklin, and out-gaining the Illini, 259 yards to 25. Illinois' defense tightened in the second half. Illini co-captain Revie Sorey noted, "We didn't feel like playing football at first. Then - quietly, without much talk - we tried at halftime to find our hearts for Greg." Michigan did not score in the second half, and Illinois cornerback Mike Gow returned a punt 45 yards for a touchdown with 2 minutes and 10 second remaining in the fourth quarter. After Gow's touchdown, Illinois succeeded in recovering an onside kick and drove to Michigan's 16-yard line before Michigan's defense held. Ohio State lost to Michigan State, leaving Michigan in sole possession of first place in the Big Ten.
- Wisconsin 28, Iowa 15
- Minnesota 24, Purdue 20
- Northwestern 24, Indiana 22

==== November 16 ====
On November 16, 1974, the Big Ten teams played five conference games.

- Michigan 51, Purdue 0. Michigan defeated Purdue, 51–0, at Michigan Stadium. The game was Purdue's most lopsided defeat in over 50 years. Michigan gained 581 yards of total offense on 396 rushing yards and 185 passing yards. Gordon Bell led the running game with 166 rushing yards and one touchdown on 23 carries. After the game, Purdue coach Alex Agase said, "Michigan was a great team today. They killed us with skill."
- Ohio State 35, Iowa 10.
- Michigan State 19, Indiana 10.
- Wisconsin 52, Northwestern 7.
- Illinois 17, Minnesota 14.

==== November 23 ====
On November 23, 1974, the Big Ten teams played five conference games.

- Ohio State 12, Michigan 10. With the Big Ten championship and a berth in the 1975 Rose Bowl at stake, Ohio State (ranked No. 3 in the AP Poll) defeated Michigan (ranked No. 2) in the sixth year of The Ten Year War between head coaches Bo Schembechler and Woody Hayes. The game was played at Ohio Stadium in Columbus, Ohio, before a crowd of 88,243 spectators. Michigan jumped to a 10–0 lead in the first quarter on a 42-yard touchdown pass from Dennis Franklin to Gil Chapman and a 37-yard field goal by Mike Lantry. Ohio State did not score a touchdown, but Tom Klaban kicked three field goals in the second quarter and another in the third quarter to give Ohio State a 12–10 lead. Michigan drove inside Ohio State's 20-yard line in the closing minutes of the game. With 18 second remaining, Lantry attempted a 33-yard field goal which was called wide left by the officials. Ohio State won 12 to 10, and the two teams finished in a tie for the Big Ten championship.
- Michigan State 60, Iowa 21.
- Wisconsin 49, Minnesota 14.
- Purdue 38, Indiana 17.
- Illinois 28, Northwestern 14.

=== Bowl games ===
On January 1, 1975, USC (ranked No. 4 in the Coaches Poll) defeated Ohio State (ranked No. 2 in the Coaches Poll), 18–17, in the 1975 Rose Bowl. USC quarterback Pat Haden passed to Shelton Diggs for the two-point conversion that gave the Trojans the victory and the national championship in the Coaches Poll.

== Statistical leaders ==
=== Passing yards ===
1. Terry Jones, Indiana (1,347)
2. Mitch Anderson, Northwestern (1,282)
3. Gregg Bohlig, Wisconsin (1,212)
4. Rob Fick, Iowa (1,059)
5. Jeff Hollenbach, Illinois (1,037)

=== Rushing yards ===
1. Archie Griffin, Ohio State (1,695)
2. Courtney Snyder, Indiana (1,254)
3. Billy Marek, Wisconsin (1,215)
4. Gordon Bell, Michigan (1,048)
5. Jim Pooler, Northwestern (949)

=== Receiving yards ===
1. Larry Burton, Purdue (702)
2. Trent Smock, Indiana (549)
3. Joe Smalzer, Illinois (525)
4. Bill Schultz, Iowa (432)
5. Scott Yelvington, Northwestern (417)

=== Total offense ===
1. Cornelius Greene, Ohio State (1,781)
2. Charles Baggett, Michigan State (1,713)
3. Archie Griffin, Ohio State (1,695)
4. Terry Jones, Indiana (1,331)
5. Courtney Snyder, Indiana (1,254)

=== Passing efficiency rating ===
1. Terry Jones, Indiana (120.2)
2. Rob Fick, Iowa (99.2)
3. Mitch Anderson, Northwestern (88.8)

=== Rushing yards per attempts ===
1. Archie Griffin, Ohio State (6.6)
2. Rick Upchurch, Minnesota (6.2)
2. Levi Jackson, Michigan State (6.2)
4. Gordon Bell, Michigan (6.0)
5. Mike Pruitt, Purdue (6.0

=== Yards per reception ===
1. Jim Smith, Michigan (18.7)
2. Larry Burton, Purdue (18.5)
3. Joe Smalzer, Illinois (18.1)
4. Trent Smock, Indiana (17.7)
5. Bill Schultz, Iowa (17.3

=== Points scored ===
1. Billy Marek, Wisconsin (114)
2. Champ Henson, Ohio State (72)
2. Archie Griffin, Ohio State (72)
4. Gordon Bell, Michigan (66)
4. Charles Baggett, Michigan State (66)

== Awards and honors ==
=== All-Big Ten honors ===
The following players were picked by the Associated Press (AP) and/or the United Press International (UPI) as first-team players on the 1974 All-Big Ten Conference football team.

Offense

Position	Name	Team	Selectors
Quarterback	Cornelius Greene	Ohio State	AP, UPI
Running back	Archie Griffin	Ohio State	AP, UPI
Running back	Billy Marek	Wisconsin	AP, UPI
Running back	Courtney Snyder	Indiana	AP
Running back	Levi Jackson	Michigan State	UPI
End	Larry Burton	Purdue	AP [end], UPI [wide receiver]
End	Doug France	Ohio State	AP [end]
End	Jack Novak	Wisconsin	UPI [tight end]
Tackle	Dennis Lick	Wisconsin	AP, UPI
Tackle	Kurt Schumacher	Ohio State	UPI
Tackle	Paul Hiemenz	Northwestern	AP
Guard	Ralph Perretta	Purdue	AP, UPI
Guard	Dick Mack	Ohio State	UPI
Center	Steve Myers	Ohio State	AP [guard], UPI
Center	Dennis Franks	Michigan	AP

Defense

Position	Name	Team	Selectors
Lineman	Pete Cusick	Ohio State	AP [front 5], UPI [def. tackle]
Lineman	Tim Davis	Michigan	AP [front 5], UPI [middle guard]
Lineman	Otto Smith	Michigan State	AP [front 5], UPI [def. end]
Lineman	James Taubert	Michigan State	UPI [def. tackle]
Lineman	Van DeCree	Ohio State	UPI [def. end]
Lineman	Dan Jilek	Michigan	UPI [def. end]
Lineman	Ken Novak	Purdue	AP [front 5]
Lineman	Jeff Perlinger	Michigan	AP [front 5]
Linebacker	Terrence, McClowry	Michigan State	AP, UPI
Linebacker	Steve Strinko	Michigan	AP, UPI
Linebacker	Tom Hicks	Illinois	AP
Defensive back	Dave Brown	Michigan	AP, UPI
Defensive back	Neal Colzie	Ohio State	AP, UPI
Defensive back	Don Dufek	Michigan	UPI
Defensive back	Earl Douthitt	Iowa	AP
Defensive back	Steve Luke	Ohio State	UPI

=== All-American honors ===
At the end of the 1974 season, Big Ten players secured four of the consensus first-team picks for the 1974 College Football All-America Team. The Big Ten's consensus All-Americans were:

Position	Name	Team	Selectors
Defensive back	Dave Brown	Michigan	AFCA, AP, FWAA, UPI, WCFF, FN, NEA, Time, TSN
Running back	Archie Griffin	Ohio State	AFCA, AP, FWAA, UPI, WCFF, FN, NEA, TSN
Offensive tackle	Kurt Schumacher	Ohio State	AFCA, FWAA, UPI, WCFF, NEA, Time, TSN
Center	Steve Myers	Ohio State	AP, UPI, FN

Other Big Ten players who were named first-team All-Americans by at least one selector were:

Position	Name	Team	Selectors
Wide receiver	Larry Burton	Purdue	FWAA, TSN, Time
Tight end	Doug France	Ohio State	Time [tie]
Offensive tackle	Dennis Lick	Wisconsin	FN
Defensive end	Van DeCree	Ohio State	UPI, FN
Defensive tackle	Pete Cusick	Ohio State	TSN
Defensive back	Neal Colzie	Ohio State	UPI, NEA [cornerback], TSN, Time [cornerback]
Punter	Tom Skladany	Ohio State	FWAA

=== Other awards ===
Ohio State running back Archie Griffin won the 1974 Heisman Trophy. Michigan quarterback Dennis Franklin finished sixth in the Heisman voting.

Michigan State's Denny Stolz was named Big Ten Coach of the Year.

== 1975 NFL draft ==
The 1975 NFL draft was held in New York on January 28–29, 1975. The following players were among the first 100 picks:

Name	Position	Team	Round	Overall pick
Larry Burton	Wide receiver	Purdue	1	7
Kurt Schumacher	Offensive tackle	Ohio State	1	12
Doug France	Offensive tackle	Ohio State	1	20
Neal Colzie	Cornerback	Ohio State	1	24
Dave Brown	Cornerback	Michigan	1	26
Pete Cusick	Defensive tackle	Ohio State	3	66
Steve Luke	Defensive Back	Ohio State	4	88
Champ Henson	Running back	Ohio State	4	89
Rick Upchurch	Wide receiver	Minnesota	4	95
Rick Upchurch	Wide receiver	Minnesota	4	100
