= 1974 Michigan Wolverines football team =

American college football season

1974 Michigan Wolverines football
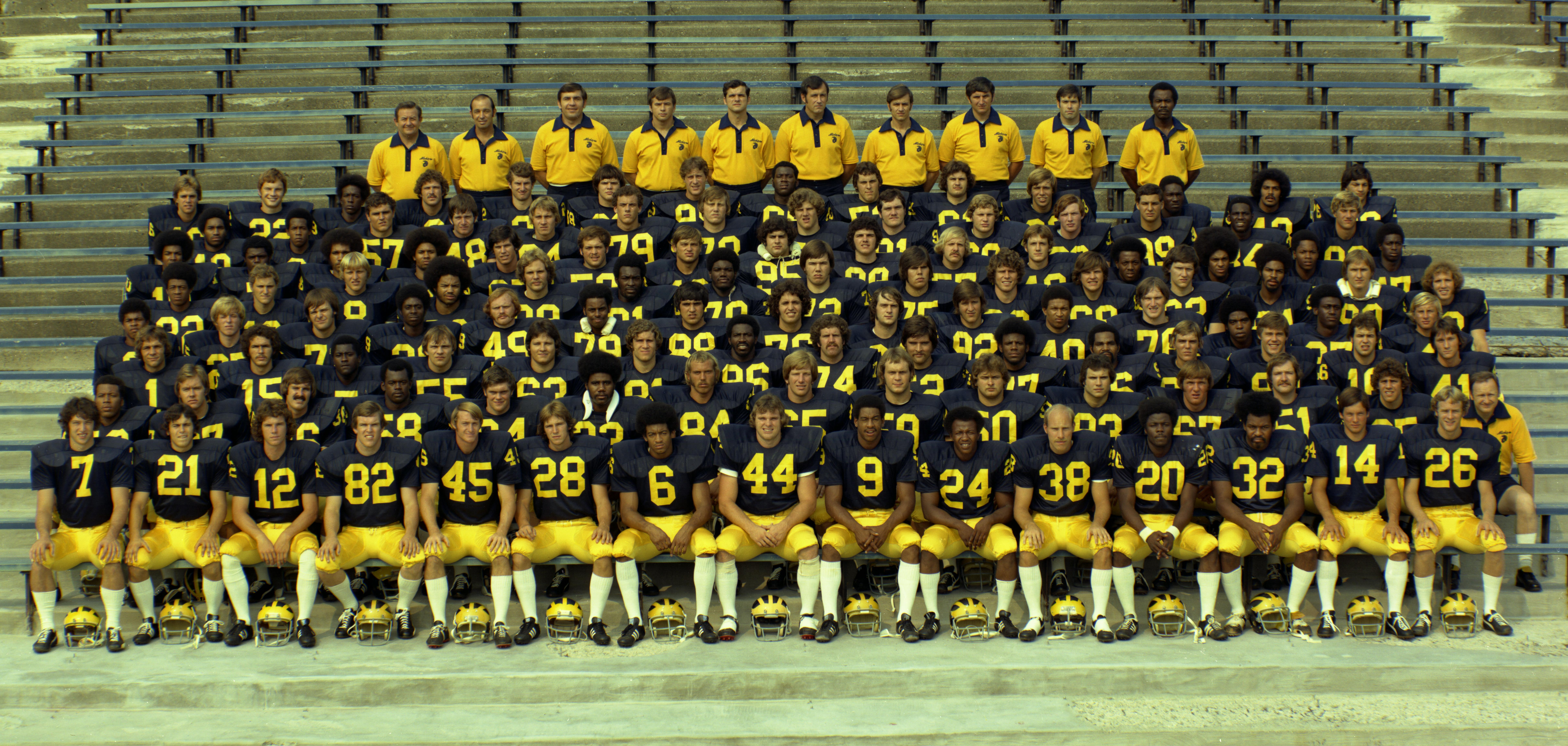
- The 1974 football team

Big Ten co-champion
- Conference: Big Ten Conference

Ranking
- Coaches: No. 5
- AP: No. 3
- Record: 10–1 (7–1 Big Ten)
- Head coach: Bo Schembechler (6th season)
- Defensive coordinator: Gary Moeller (2nd season)
- MVP: Steve Strinko
- Captains: Dave Brown; Dennis Franklin
- Home stadium: Michigan Stadium

1974 Big Ten Conference football standings
	Conf.					Overall
Team	W		L		T	W		L		T
No. 3 Michigan +	7	–	1	–	0	10	–	1	–	0
No. 4 Ohio State +	7	–	1	–	0	10	–	2	–	0
No. 12 Michigan State	6	–	1	–	1	7	–	3	–	1
Wisconsin	5	–	3	–	0	7	–	4	–	0
Illinois	4	–	3	–	1	6	–	4	–	1
Purdue	3	–	5	–	0	4	–	6	–	1
Minnesota	2	–	6	–	0	4	–	7	–	0
Iowa	2	–	6	–	0	3	–	8	–	0
Northwestern	2	–	6	–	0	3	–	8	–	0
Indiana	1	–	7	–	0	1	–	10	–	0
+ – Conference co-champions; Rankings from AP Poll

The 1974 Michigan Wolverines football team was an American football team that represented the University of Michigan in the 1974 Big Ten Conference football season. In their sixth year under head coach Bo Schembechler, the Wolverines compiled a 10–1 record, outscored opponents 324 to 75, and were ranked #3 in final AP Poll. Michigan won the first ten games of the 1974 season in convincing fashion, including blowout victories over Colorado (31–0), Navy (52–0), Minnesota (49–0), and Purdue (51–0). In the final game of the season, #2 Michigan faced #3 Ohio State. The Wolverines lost by a score of 12–10, as place-kicker Mike Lantry missed a last-minute field goal that would have given Michigan a victory.

On offense, the team was led by quarterback Dennis Franklin who completed 58 of 104 passes for 933 yards and rushed 108 times for 209 yards. Three Michigan running backs combined for 2,510 rushing yards. Gordon Bell led the way with 1,048 rushing yards and 11 touchdowns. Rob Lytle added 802 rushing yards, and Chuck Heater 660 yards. Center Dennis Franks and end Dan Jilek were selected as All-Big Ten Conference players.

On defense, the Wolverines held opponents to 75 points, an average of 6.8 points per game. Cornerback Dave Brown was selected as first-team All-American for the second straight year. Five Wolverine defenders were selected for the All-Big Ten Conference team, including Brown, middle linebacker Steve Strinko, wolfman Don Dufek, left tackle Jeff Perlinger, and middle guard Tim Davis. Strinko led the team in total tackles for the second consecutive year and was selected as the team's most valuable player.

== Schedule ==
Date	Opponent	Rank	Site	TV	Result	Attendance	Source
September 14	Iowa	No. 6	Michigan Stadium; Ann Arbor, MI		W 24–7	76,802	
September 21	Colorado*	No. 6	Michigan Stadium; Ann Arbor, MI		W 31–0	91,203	
September 28	Navy*	No. 5	Michigan Stadium; Ann Arbor, MI		W 52–0	104,232	
October 5	at Stanford*	No. 4	Stanford Stadium; Stanford, CA		W 27–16	52,500	
October 12	Michigan State	No. 4	Michigan Stadium; Ann Arbor, MI (rivalry)		W 21–7	104,682	
October 19	at Wisconsin	No. 3	Camp Randall Stadium; Madison, WI		W 24–20	78,911	
October 26	Minnesota^{†}	No. 3	Michigan Stadium; Ann Arbor, MI (Little Brown Jug)		W 49–0	96,284	
November 2	at Indiana	No. 3	Memorial Stadium; Bloomington, IN		W 21–7	32,873	
November 9	at Illinois	No. 4	Memorial Stadium; Champaign, Il (rivalry)		W 14–6	60,670	
November 16	Purdue	No. 3	Michigan Stadium; Ann Arbor, MI		W 51–0	88,902	
November 23	at No. 3 Ohio State	No. 2	Ohio Stadium; Columbus, OH (The Game)	ABC	L 10–12	88,243	
*Non-conference game; ^{†}Homecoming; Rankings from AP Poll released prior to the game

== Season summary ==
=== Preseason ===
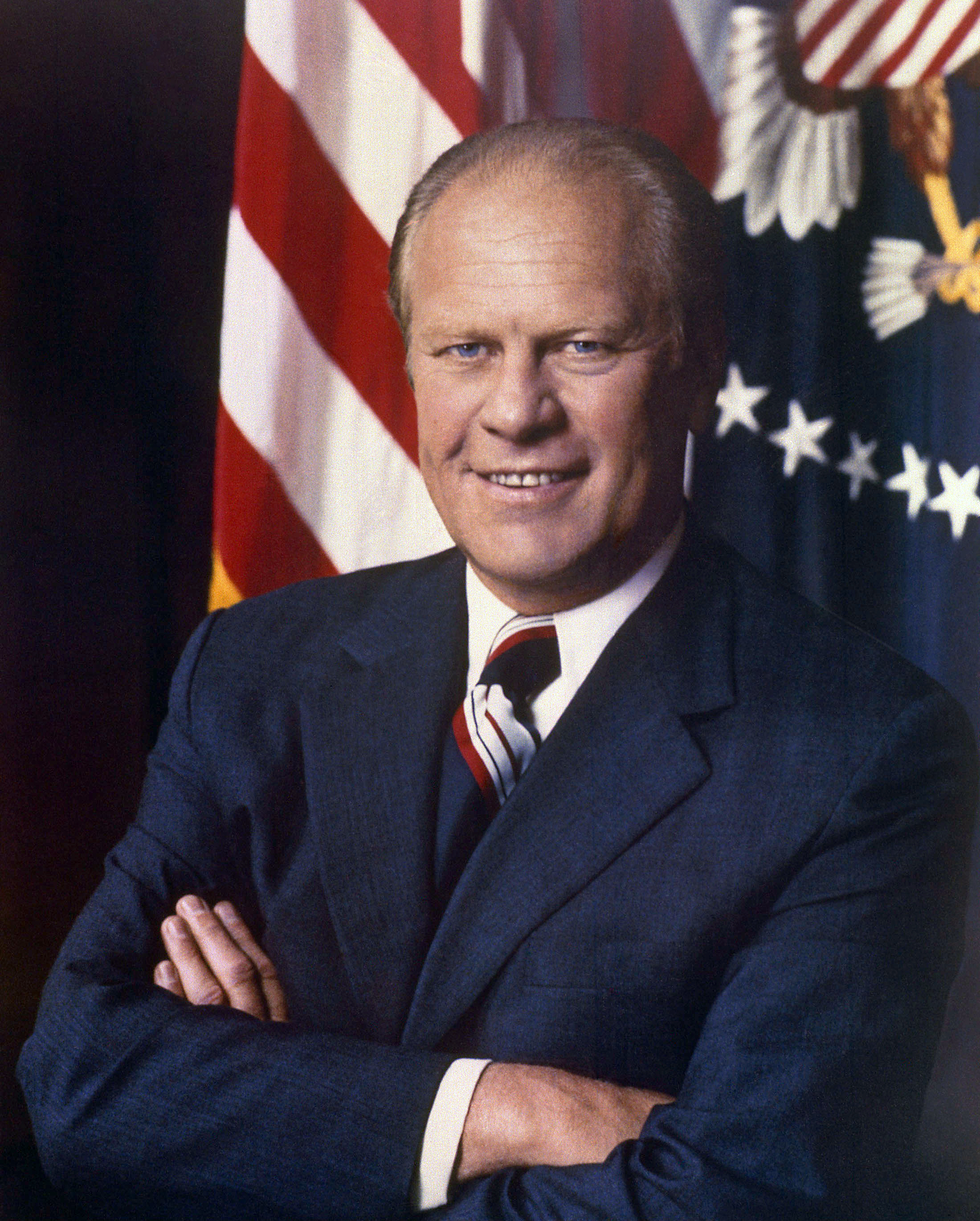
Former Michigan star Gerald Ford ascended to the U.S. presidency in August 1974.

The 1973 Michigan football team compiled a 10–0–1 record. Several key offensive players from the 1973 team returned in 1974, including quarterback Dennis Franklin, a trio of tailbacks in Gordon Bell, Chuck Heater and Rob Lytle, wing back Gil Chapman, end Jim Smith, and center Dennis Franks. Returning players on defense included safety Dave Brown (a 1973 All-American), defensive back Don Dufek, and linebackers Carl Russ and Steve Strinko. Defensive tackle and 1973 All-American Dave Gallagher was lost to graduation.

Perhaps the biggest story surrounding the Michigan football program in the interim between the 1973 and 1974 seasons was the appointment of former Michigan football player Gerald Ford as Vice President of the United States in December 1973 and his ascension to the Presidency in August 1974. Ford drew attention to the program as he often had the Naval band play the University of Michigan fight song, The Victors, before state events instead of Hail to the Chief. During Ford's first foreign trip as President in November 1974, Emperor Hirohito of Japan greeted Ford with a military band playing The Victors.

=== Week 1: Iowa ===
Iowa at Michigan

Team	1	2	3	4	Total
Iowa	0	0	0	7	7
• Michigan	14	0	7	3	24

- Date: Saturday, September 14
- Location: Michigan Stadium, Ann Arbor, Michigan
- Game attendance: 76,802

Scoring summary
1	Michigan	Heater 2 yard run (Lantry kick)	Michigan 7-0
1	Michigan	Elzinga 1 yard run (Lantry kick)	Michigan 14-0
3	Michigan	Chapman 10 yard pass from Elzinga (Lantry kick)	Michigan 21-0
4	Michigan	Lantry 30 yard field goal	Michigan 24-0
4	Iowa	Wellington 1 yard run (Quartaro kick)	Michigan 24-7

On September 14, 1974, Michigan opened its season with a 24 to 7 victory over Iowa. Michigan rushed for 315 yards in the game, led by Rob Lytle (86 yards on 14 carries), Chuck Heater (62 yards on 17 carries and a two-yard touchdown run in the first quarter), and Gil Chapman (55 yards on 6 carries). Michigan quarterback Dennis Franklin did not appear in the game due to illness and was replaced by Mark Elzinga, who completed 2 of 11 passes for 34 yards. One of Elzinga's two completions was caught by Gil Chapman for a touchdown in the third quarter. Elzinga also ran one yard for Michigan's second touchdown in the first quarter. Kicker Mike Lantry kicked a 30-yard field goal in the fourth quarter and converted all three extra points. Iowa's only touchdown was scored in the final minute of the fourth quarter.

=== Week 2: Colorado ===
Team	1	2	3	4	Total
Colorado	0	0	0	0	0
• Michigan	7	7	7	10	31

- Date: September 21
- Location: Michigan Stadium, Ann Arbor, Michigan
- Game attendance: 91,203

Scoring summary
1	MICH	Brown 88 yard punt return (Lantry kick)	Michigan 7–0
2	MICH	Franklin recovered fumble in end zone (Lantry kick)	Michigan 14–0
3	MICH	Heater 5 yard run (Lantry kick)	Michigan 21–0
4	MICH	Lantry 19 yard field goal	Michigan 24–0
4	MICH	DenBoer 5 yard pass from Franklin (Lantry kick)	Michigan 31–0

On September 21, 1974, Michigan defeated Colorado by a 31 to 0 score before a crowd of 91,203 at Michigan Stadium. The game matched Bo Schembechler against Colorado head coach Bill Mallory. Both had coached under Woody Hayes at Ohio State, and Mallory had taken Schembechler's place as head coach at Miami (OH) in 1969.

Michigan defensive back Dave Brown opened the scoring two minutes into the game by returning a punt 88 yards from the 12-yard line for a touchdown. After being discharged from the hospital four days before the game, quarterback Dennis Franklin returned against Colorado. Franklin completed 11 of 16 passes for 115 yards with one touchdown (a five-yard pass caught by Greg DenBoer in the fourth quarter) and no interceptions. Franklin also rushed for 69 yards on 13 carries and scored a touchdown in the second quarter after recovering Rob Lytle's fumble in the end zone. After the game, head coach Bo Schembechler said, "I told you guys he was a decent quarterback didn't I? And this was after only three days of practice after lying on his back for 10 days. I thought his performance was remarkable. Why, it was almost an aerial circus!"

Michigan also gained 273 rushing yards. Chuck Heater led the Wolverines in rushing with 74 yards on 16 carries, including a five-yard touchdown run in the third quarter. Lytle added 66 yards on 13 carries and Gordon Bell 49 yards on six carries. Kicker Mike Lantry recovered a fumble on a kickoff, kicked a 19-yard field goal in the fourth quarter and converted all three extra points. Michigan's defense held Colorado to 44 rushing yards on 30 carries.

=== Week 3: Navy ===
Team	1	2	3	4	Total
Navy	0	0	0	0	0
• Michigan	7	24	14	7	52

- Date: September 28
- Location: Michigan Stadium, Ann Arbor, Michigan
- Game attendance: 104,232

Scoring summary
1	MICH	Heater, 1-yard run (Lantry kick)	Michigan 7–0
2	MICH	Heater 3-yard run (Lantry kick)	Michigan 14–0
2	MICH	Bell 3-yard run (Lantry kick)	Michigan 21–0
2	MICH	Bell 25-yard run (Lantry kick)	Michigan 28–0
2	MICH	Lantry 31-yard field goal	Michigan 31–0
3	MICH	Bell 2-yard run (Lantry kick)	Michigan 38–0
3	MICH	Smith 29-yard pass from Franklin (Lantry kick)	Michigan 45–0
4	MICH	Lytle 6-yard run (Lantry kick)	Michigan 52–0

On September 28, 1974, Michigan defeated George Welsh's Navy Midshipmen by a 52-0 score. The game was played at Michigan Stadium before a crowd of 104,232, which included thousands of high school band students participating in the annual band day celebration. Michigan's backs dominated, rushing for 340 yards and six touchdowns on 67 carries. Gordon Bell rushed for 57 yards and three touchdowns on nine carries, Chuck Heater gained 61 yards and two on 13 carries, and Rob Lytle rushed for 101 yards and a touchdown on 15 carries. Dennis Franklin completed five of six passes for 85 yards, including a 29-yard touchdown pass to Jim Smith in the third quarter. Mike Lantry kicked a 31-yard field goal and converted all seven extra points.

=== Week 4: at Stanford ===
Team	1	2	3	4	Total
• Michigan	0	6	14	7	27
Stanford	6	3	0	7	16

- Date: October 5
- Location: Stanford Stadium, Stanford, CA

Scoring summary
1	STAN	Langford 52-yard field goal	Stanford 3–0
1	STAN	Langford 42-yard field goal	Stanford 6–0
2	MICH	Bell 1-yard run (kick failed)	Tied 6–6
2	STAN	Langford 42-yard field goal	Stanford 9–6
3	MICH	Franklin 12-yard run (Lantry kick)	Michigan 13–9
3	MICH	Franklin 4-yard run (Lantry kick)	Michigan 20–9
3	STAN	Laidlaw 7-yard pass from Wardvogel (Langford kick)	Michigan 20–16
4	MICH	Corbin 2-yard run (Lantry kick)	Michigan 27–16

On October 5, 1974, Michigan defeated Stanford by a 27-16 score at Stanford Stadium. Stanford took a 9-6 lead at halftime as Mike Langford kicked three field goals, and the Stanford defense did not allow a first down during the first quarter. In the second quarter, Gordon Bell scored on a one-yard run, but the kick for extra point failed. Also in the second quarter, Stanford intercepted a pass by Dennis Franklin, marking Michigan's first turnover in 255 plays during the 1974 season. In the third quarter, Franklin rushed for two touchdowns to give Michigan a 20-9 lead. The teams traded touchdowns in the fourth quarter, including a two-yard run by Michigan backup Scott Corbin. Stanford quarterback Jerry Waldvogel completed 21 of 40 passes and 229 yards. The Wolverines rushed for 317 yards on 66 carries, including 96 yard for Rob Lytle and 72 yards each for Franklin and Gordon Bell.

=== Week 5: Michigan State ===
Team	1	2	3	4	Total
Michigan State	0	0	0	7	7
• Michigan	7	14	0	0	21

- Date: October 12
- Location: Michigan Stadium, Ann Arbor, Michigan
- Game attendance: 104,682

Scoring summary
1	MICH	Bell 13-yard run (Lantry kick)	Michigan 7–0
2	MICH	Jilek recovered MSU fumble in end zone (Lantry kick)	Michigan 14–0
2	MICH	Smith 45-yard pass from Franklin (Lantry kick)	Michigan 21–0
4	MSU	Cobb 15-yard pass from Baggett (Nielsen kick)	Michigan 21–7

On October 12, 1974, Michigan defeated Denny Stolz's Michigan State Spartans by a 21-7 score. The game, played at Michigan Stadium, attracted a crowd of 104,682, reported to be "the second largest crowd in modern N.C.A.A. history" behind the 1973 Michigan-Ohio State game. Gordon Bell led Michigan's rushing attack with 73 yards on 16 carries, including a 13-yard touchdown run in the first quarter. Dennis Franklin completed five of nine passes for 84 yards, including a 45-yard touchdown pass to Jim Smith in the second quarter, but left the game in the third quarter with bruised ribs. Linebacker Dan Jilek also scored in the second quarter when he forced a fumble on a punt attempt and then recovered it in the end zone.

=== Week 6: at Wisconsin ===
Team	1	2	3	4	Total
• Michigan	0	7	7	10	24
Wisconsin	0	7	0	13	20

- Date: October 19
- Location: Camp Randall Stadium, Madison, WI
- Game attendance: 78,911

Scoring summary
2	WIS	Pollard 2-yard run (Lamia kick)	Wisconsin 7–0
2	MICH	Heater 22-yard run (Lantry kick)	Tied 7–7
3	MICH	DenBoer 8-yard pass from Franklin (Lantry kick)	Michigan 14–7
4	MICH	Bell 1-yard run (Lantry kick)	Stanford 21–7
4	WIS	Morgan 1-yard run (Lamia kick)	Michigan 21–14
4	MICH	Lantry 31-yard field goal	Michigan 24–14
4	WIS	Mack 26-yard pass from Hohlig (run failed)	Michigan 24–20

On October 19, 1974, Michigan defeated John Jardine's Wisconsin Badgers by a 24–20 score. The game was played to a record crowd of 78,911 at Camp Randall Stadium in Madison, Wisconsin. Michigan gained 265 rushing yards led by Chuck Heater who had 101 yards on 20 carries and a 22-yard touchdown run in the second quarter. Dennis Franklin completed five of seven passes for 71 yards, including an eight-yard touchdown pass to Greg DenBoer in the third quarter. Gordon Bell scored Michigan's third touchdown on a one-yard run in the fourth quarter. Mike Lantry kicked a 31-yard field goal in the fourth quarter and converted all three extra points. Michigan gave up 206 rushing yards to Wisconsin, prompting coach Schembechler to say, "That's the most anyone has run on us in years. I was surprised they could do that well against us, but their offense is very, very good."

=== Week 7: Minnesota ===
Team	1	2	3	4	Total
Minnesota	0	0	0	0	0
• Michigan	7	14	14	14	49

- Date: October 26
- Location: Michigan Stadium, Ann Arbor, Michigan
- Game attendance: 96,284

Scoring summary
1	MICH	Chapman 20-yard run (Lantry kick)	Michigan 7–0
2	MICH	Heater 1-yard run (kick failed)	Michigan 13–0
2	MICH	Bell 2-yard run (Franklin)	Michigan 21–0
3	MICH	Chapman 5-yard run (Lantry kick)	Michigan 28–0
3	MICH	Smith 22-yard pass from Franklin (Lantry kick)	Michigan 35–0
4	MICH	Elzinga 49-yard run (Lantry kick)	Michigan 42–0
4	MICH	Corbin 2-yard run (Lantry kick)	Michigan 49–0

On October 26, 1974, Michigan defeated Minnesota by a 49-0 score. The game was played at Michigan Stadium before a crowd of 96,284. Michigan rolled to over 600 yards in the game. On the ground, the Wolverines totaled 521 rushing yards, led by Rob Lytle (158 yards on 20 carries) and Gordon Bell (134 yards and a touchdown on 17 carries). Gil Chapman gained 41 yards and scored two touchdowns on six carries. Chuck Heater, Mark Elzinga and Scott Corbin also scored rushing touchdowns. Franklin completed six of seven passes for 99 yards, including a 22-yard touchdown pass to Jim Smith in the third quarter.

=== Week 8: Indiana ===
Team	1	2	3	4	Total
• Michigan	0	14	0	7	21
Indiana	0	0	0	7	7

- Date: November 2
- Location: Memorial Stadium, Bloomington, IN
- Game attendance: 32,873

Scoring summary
2	MICH	Bell 12-yard run (Lantry kick)	Michigan 7–0
2	MICH	Bell 3-yard run (Lantry kick)	Michigan 14–0
4	IND	Smock 5-yard pass from Jones (Stavroff kick)	Michigan 14–7
4	MICH	Chapman 1-yard run (Lantry kick)	Michigan 21–7

On November 2, 1974, Michigan defeated Lee Corso's Indiana Hoosiers by a 21–7 score at Memorial Stadium in Bloomington, Indiana. After Gordon Bell returned the opening kickoff to the 45-yard line, Michigan drove to Indiana's 13-yard line, but Rob Lytle's fumble ended the drive. In all the Wolverines turned the ball over three times, twice on fumbles by Lytle and once on an interception of a Dennis Franklin pass. Neither team scored in the first quarter, but Gordon Bell ran for two touchdowns in the second quarter to give Michigan a 14-0 lead at halftime. Michigan totaled 344 rushing yards in the game with gaining 159 yards on 23 carries, Chuck Heater contributing 97 yards on 16 carries, and Lytle rushing for 63 yards on 11 carries. Indiana scored in the fourth quarter to cut Michigan's lead to seven points, but Gil Chapman scored with 36 seconds remaining in the game to extend the score to 21-7.

=== Week 9: Illinois ===
Team	1	2	3	4	Total
• Michigan	7	7	0	0	14
Illinois	0	0	0	6	6

- Date: November 9
- Game attendance: 60,670

Scoring summary
1	MICH	Bell 9-yard run (Lantry kick)	Michigan 7–0
2	MICH	Franklin 1-yard run (Lantry kick)	Michigan 14–0
4	ILLI	Gow 45-yard punt return (run failed)	Michigan 14–6

On November 9, 1974, Michigan defeated Illinois by a 14–6 score at Memorial Stadium in Champaign, Illinois. The Illini played the game in mourning as 20-year-old defensive end Greg Williams was fatally shot at 2:30 a.m. during an altercation at a fraternity party and died eight hours later on the morning of the game. Michigan dominated the first half, scoring twice on runs by Gordon Bell and Dennis Franklin, and out-gaining the Illini, 259 yards to 25. Illinois' defense tightened in the second half. Illini co-captain Revie Sorey noted, "We didn't feel like playing football at first. Then - quietly, without much talk - we tried at halftime to find our hearts for Greg." Michigan did not score in the second half, and Illinois cornerback Mike Gow returned a punt 45 yards for a touchdown with 2 minutes and 10 second remaining in the fourth quarter. After Gow's touchdown, Illinois succeeded in recovering an onside kick and drove to Michigan's 16-yard line before Michigan's defense held. Ohio State lost to Michigan State, leaving Michigan in sole possession of first place in the Big Ten Conference.

=== Week 10: Purdue ===
Team	1	2	3	4	Total
Purdue	0	0	0	0	0
• Michigan	3	21	17	10	51

- Date: November 16
- Location: Michigan Stadium, Ann Arbor, Michigan
- Game attendance: 88,902

Scoring summary
1	MICH	Lantry 43-yard field goal	Michigan 3–0
2	MICH	Smith 52-yard pass from Franklin (Lantry kick)	Michigan 10–0
2	MICH	Heater 1-yard run (Lantry kick)	Michigan 17–0
2	MICH	Bell 6-yard run (Lantry kick)	Michigan 24–0
3	MICH	Lantry 32-yard field goal	Michigan 27–0
3	MICH	Chapman 23-yard pass from Franklin (Lantry kick)	Michigan 34–0
3	MICH	Lytle 36-yard pass from Elzinga (Lantry kick)	Michigan 41–0
4	MICH	Lantry 35-yard field goal	Michigan 44–0
4	MICH	Lytle 7-yard run (Lantry kick)	Michigan 51–0

On November 16, 1974, Michigan defeated Purdue by a 51-0 score at Michigan Stadium. The game was Purdue's most lopsided defeat in over 50 years. Michigan gained 581 yards of total offense on 396 rushing yards and 185 passing yards. Gordon Bell led the running game with 166 rushing yards and one touchdown on 23 carries. Rob Lytle added 66 yards and a touchdown, and Chuck Heater contributed 48 yards and a touchdown. Dennis Franklin completed 7 of 12 passes for 149 yards and two touchdowns, as Michigan played with three wide receivers. Backup quarterback Mark Elzinga also threw a 36-yard touchdown pass to Lytle. After the game, Purdue coach Alex Agase said, "Michigan was a great team today. They killed us with skill."

=== Week 11: Ohio State ===
Team	1	2	3	4	Total
Michigan	10	0	0	0	10
• Ohio State	0	9	3	0	12

- Date: November 23
- Game attendance: 88,243
- Referee: Robert Fallon
- TV announcers (ABC): Keith Jackson, Joe Paterno

Scoring summary
1	MICH	Chapman 42-yard pass from Franklin (Lantry kick)	Michigan 7–0
1	MICH	Lantry 37-yard field goal	Michigan 10–0
2	OSU	Klaban 47-yard field goal	Michigan 10–3
2	OSU	Klaban 25-yard field goal	Michigan 10–6
2	OSU	Klaban 43-yard field goal	Michigan 10–9
3	OSU	Klaban 4-yard field goal	OSU 12–10

On November 23, 1974, with the Big Ten championship and a berth in the 1975 Rose Bowl at stake, Michigan played the Ohio State Buckeyes in the sixth year of The Ten Year War between head coaches Bo Schembechler and Woody Hayes. Prior to the game, Michigan was ranked #2 in the Coaches Poll with Ohio State ranked #3. The game was played at Ohio Stadium in Columbus, Ohio, before a crowd of 88,243 spectators.

Michigan jumped to a 10-0 lead in the first quarter on a 42-yard touchdown pass from Dennis Franklin to Gil Chapman and a 37-yard field goal by Mike Lantry. Ohio State did not score a touchdown against Michigan, but Tom Klaban kicked three field goals in the second quarter and another in the third quarter to give Ohio State a 12-10 lead. Michigan drove inside Ohio State's 20-yard line in the closing minutes of the game. With 18 second remaining, Lantry attempted a 33-yard field goal which was called wide left by the officials. Ohio State won 12 to 10, and the two teams finished in a tie for the Big Ten championship.

== Players ==
=== Offense ===
- James Armour, offensive guard, senior, Detroit, Michigan - started 3 games at left offensive guard
- Gordon Bell, tailback, junior, Troy, Ohio - started 3 games at tailback
- Gil Chapman, wing back, senior, Elizabeth, New Jersey - started all 11 games at fullback
- Scott Corbin, fullback, freshman, Cincinnati, Ohio
- James C. Czirr, center, junior, St. Joseph, Michigan
- Greg DenBoer, tight end, senior, Kentwood, Michigan - started all 11 games at tight end
- Mark Donahue, offensive guard, freshman, Oak Lawn, Illinois
- Walt Downing, tackle, freshman, Coatesville, Pennsylvania
- Bill Dufek, tackle, freshman, East Grand Rapids, Michigan
- Mark Elzinga, quarterback, junior, Bay City, Michigan - started 2 games at quarterback
- Dennis Franklin, quarterback, senior, Massillon, Ohio - started 9 games at quarterback
- Dennis Franks, center, senior, Bethel Park, Pennsylvania - started all 11 games at center
- James D. Hall, offensive tackle, sophomore, Ypsilanti, Michigan - started 1 game at right offensive tackle
- Chuck Heater, tailback, senior, Tiffin, Ohio - started all 11 games at wing back
- Thomas P. Jensen, center, senior, Springfield, Illinois
- Keith Johnson, split end, junior, Munster, Indiana
- R. Steven King, senior, Tiffin, Ohio - started 10 games at right offensive tackle
- Mike Lantry, place-kicker, senior, Oxford, Michigan
- Kirk Lewis, offensive guard, junior, Garden City, Michigan
- Rob Lytle, tailback, sophomore, Fremont, Ohio - started 8 games at tailback
- David F. Metz, offensive guard, senior, Harrison, Ohio - started 9 games at left offensive guard
- Les Miles, offensive guard, junior, Elyria, Ohio
- Steve Nauta, center freshman, Plymouth Meeting, Pennsylvania
- George Przygodski, tight end, junior, Grand Rapids, Michigan
- Max Richardson, tailback, freshman, Fort Wayne, Indiana
- Jim Smith, split end, sophomore, Blue Island, Illinois - started all 11 games at left end
- Jeff Spahn, quarterback, senior, Steubenville, Ohio
- Curt Stephenson, split end, sophomore, La Jolla, California
- Pat Tumpane, offensive tackle, senior, Midlothian, Illinois - started all 11 games at left tackle
- Jerry Vogele, fullback, sophomore, Cincinnati, Ohio

=== Defense ===
- John Anderson, outside linebacker, freshman, Waukesha, Wisconsin
- Harry Banks, defensive back, senior, Cleveland, Ohio - started all 11 games at strong side defensive halfback
- Larry Banks, defensive end, senior, Cleveland, Ohio - started 8 games at right defensive end, 1 game at left defensive end
- Jim Bolden, defensive back, sophomore, Akron, Ohio
- Dave Brown, safety, senior, Akron, Ohio - started all 11 games at safety
- Tim Davis, middle guard, junior, Warren, Ohio - started 6 games at middle guard
- David Devich, linebacker, junior, Highland, Indiana
- Thomas E. Drake, defensive back, senior, Midland, Michigan - started 6 games at weak-side defensive halfback
- Don Dufek, wolfman, junior, East Grand Rapids, Michigan - started all 11 games at wolfman
- Dave Elliott, defensive back, senior, Coral Gables, Florida - started 5 games at weak-side defensive halfback
- John Hennessy, defensive tackle, sophomore, Chicago, Illinois
- Dwight Hicks, defensive back-running back, freshman, Pennsauken, New Jersey
- Bill Hoban, defensive tackle, senior, Chicago, Illinois
- Michael G. Holmes, defensive end, junior Akron, Ohio
- Derek Howard, wide receiver - defensive back, freshman, Hamilton, Ohio
- Mark Jacoby, wolf, senior, Toledo, Ohio
- Dan Jilek, defensive end, junior, Sterling Heights, Michigan - started all 11 games (10 at left defensive end, 1 at right defensive end)
- Larry L. Johnson, defensive end, senior, Munster, Indiana - started 2 games at right defensive end
- Kurt Kampe III, defensive back, senior, Defiance, Ohio
- Richard A. Koschalk, middle guard, junior, Toledo, Ohio - started 5 games at middle guard
- Bob Lang, middle guard, sophomore, Chicago, Illinois
- Greg Morton, defensive tackle, junior, Akron, Ohio - started all 11 games at right defensive tackle
- Calvin O'Neal, linebacker, junior, Saginaw, Michigan - started 2 games at wide linebacker, 1 game at middle linebacker
- Jeff Perlinger, defensive tackle, junior, Crystal, Minnesota - started all 11 games at left defensive tackle
- Carl Russ, linebacker, senior, Muskegon Heights, Michigan - started 9 games at wide linebacker
- Geoffrey Steger, wolf, senior, Winnetka, Illinois
- Steve Strinko, linebacker, junior, Middletown, Ohio - started 10 games at middle linebacker
- Jerry Zuver, safety, sophomore, Archbold, Ohio

=== Awards and honors ===
- All-Americans: Dave Brown (AP, UPI, NEA, WC, AFCA, FWAA, TSN, FN, Time)
- All-Big Ten: Dave Brown (AP-1, UPI-1), Tim Davis (AP-1, UPI-1), Steve Strinko (AP-1, UPI-1), Don Dufek (AP-2, UPI-1), Dennis Franks (AP-1, UPI-2), Jeff Perlinger (AP-1), Dan Jilek (UPI-1), Gordon Bell (AP-2, UPI-2), Dennis Franklin (AP-2, UPI-2), Steve King (AP-2), and Gil Chapman (UPI-2)
- Most Valuable Player: Steve Strinko
- Meyer Morton Award: Dennis Franklin
- John Maulbetsch Award: Rob Lytle
- Frederick Matthei Award: Kirk Lewis
- Arthur Robinsion Scholarship Award: Larry Johnson

=== Professional football ===
The following 26 players from the 1974 Michigan football team were drafted to play and/or actually played professional football in the National Football League (NFL):

1. Linebacker John Anderson was selected by the Green Bay Packers in the first round of the 1977 NFL draft and played 12 seasons with the Packers from 1978 to 1989. He was later named to the NFL 1980s All-Decade Team.
2. Defensive back Harry Banks was selected by the Buffalo Bills in the seventh round of the 1975 NFL draft. Banks was placed on waivers by the Bills in late July 1976.
3. Running back Gordon Bell was selected by the New York Giants in the fourth round of the 1976 NFL draft and played three seasons in the NFL with the Giants and St. Louis Cardinals.
4. Defensive back Dave Brown was selected by the Pittsburgh Steelers in the first round of the 1975 NFL draft and played 15 seasons in the NFL with the Steelers, Seattle Seahawks and Green Bay Packers.
5. Wide receiver Gil Chapman was selected by the Buffalo Bills in the seventh round of the 1975 NFL draft and played one season in the NFL with the New Orleans Saints.
6. Center Jim Czirr was selected by the Denver Broncos in the ninth round of the 1976 NFL draft. In July 1976, Czirr announced that he would not report to the Broncos as he was opting not to continue playing football due to an arthritic vertebrae in his neck.
7. Tight end Greg DenBoer was selected by the Baltimore Colts in the eighth round of the 1975 NFL Draft.
8. Offensive guard Mark Donahue was selected by the Cincinnati Bengals in the 11th round of the 1978 NFL draft and played two seasons in the NFL with the Bengals.
9. Offensive lineman Walt Downing was selected by the San Francisco 49ers in the second round of the 1978 NFL draft and played six seasons in the NFL with the 49ers.
10. Defensive back Tom Drake was selected by the Buffalo Bills in the 11th round of the 1975 NFL Draft. He was cut by the Colts in mid-September 1975.
11. Defensive back Don Dufek was selected by the Seattle Seahawks in the fifth round of the 1976 NFL draft and played eight seasons with the Seahawks.
12. Quarterback Dennis Franklin was selected by the Detroit Lions in the sixth round of the 1975 NFL draft and played two seasons in the NFL as a wide receiver for the Lions.
13. Center Dennis Franks was undrafted but played four seasons in the NFL with the Philadelphia Eagles and Detroit Lions.
14. Running back Chuck Heater was selected by the New Orleans Saints in the tenth round of the 1975 NFL Draft. He was released by the Saints in early September 1975.
15. Linebacker John Hennessy was selected by the New York Jets in the 10th round of the 1977 NFL draft and played three seasons for the Jets.
16. Defensive back Dwight Hicks was selected by the Detroit Lions in the sixth round of the 1978 NFL draft and played eight seasons in the NFL with the San Francisco 49ers and Indianapolis Colts.
17. Defensive end Dan Jilek was selected by the Buffalo Bills in the fourth round of the 1976 NFL draft and played four seasons for the Bills.
18. Offensive tackle Steve King was selected by the New York Jets in the fifth round of the 1976 NFL Draft.
19. Running back Rob Lytle was selected by the Denver Broncos in the second round of the 1977 NFL draft and played seven seasons with the Broncos.
20. Defensive tackle Greg Morton was selected by the Buffalo Bills in the eighth round of the 1977 NFL draft and played one season for the Bills.
21. Linebacker Calvin O'Neal was selected by the Baltimore Colts in the sixth round of the 1977 NFL draft and played one season for the Colts.
22. Defensive tackle Jeff Perlinger was selected by the San Diego Chargers in the 10th round of the 1976 NFL Draft. He later signed with Calgary Stampeders but was cut in mid-July 1976.
23. Linebacker Carl Russ was selected by the Atlanta Falcons in the 13th round of the 1975 NFL draft and played three seasons in the NFL with the Falcons and New York Jets.
24. Wide receiver Jim Smith was selected by the Pittsburgh Steelers in the third round of the 1977 NFL draft and played seven seasons with the Steelers.
25. Linebacker Steve Strinko was selected by the Detroit Lions in the ninth round of the 1975 NFL Draft.
26. Fullback Jerry Vogele was selected by the New England Patriots in the ninth round of the 1977 NFL Draft. Vogele sustained a knee injury in a pre-season game in September 1977 and was required to undergo surgery.

== Coaching staff ==
- Head coach: Bo Schembechler
- Assistant coaches

- Offense: Chuck Stobart (offensive backfield), Tirrel Burton (offensive ends), Elliott Uzelac (offensive line), Jerry Hanlon (offensive line)
- Defense: Gary Moeller (defensive coordinator), Jack Harbaugh (defensive backfield), Jed Hughes (linebackers), Tom Reed (defensive line), Bill McCartney (defensive ends)
- Other: Dennis Brown, Mike Hollway (graduate assistant)

- Trainer: Lindsy McLean
- Manager: Thomas Rasdale

== Statistics ==
=== Rushing ===
Player	Attempts	Net yards	Yards per attempt	Touchdowns
Gordon Bell	174	1048	6.0	11
Rob Lytle	140	802	5.7	2
Chuck Heater	153	660	4.3	7
Dennis Franklin	108	290	2.7	5

=== Passing ===
Player	Attempts	Completions	Interceptions	Comp %	Yards	Yds/Comp	TD	Long
Dennis Franklin	104	58	5	55.8	933	16.1	8	52
Mark Elzinga	21	5	0	23.8	104	20.8	2	36

=== Receiving ===
Player	Receptions	Yards	Yds/Recp	TD	Long
Jim Smith	21	392	18.7	4	52
Gil Chapman	23	378	16.4	3	48
Greg DenBoer	8	103	12.9	2	26
Rob Lytle	4	65	16.3	1	36

=== Kickoff returns ===
Player	Returns	Yards	Yds/Return	TD	Long
Gil Chapman	12	231	19.3	0	30

=== Punt returns ===
Player	Returns	Yards	Yds/Return	TD	Long
Dave Brown	20	212	10.6	1	88
Gil Chapman	12	91	7.6	0	16

== See also ==
- 1974 in Michigan
