= Carl Russ =

American football player (born 1953)

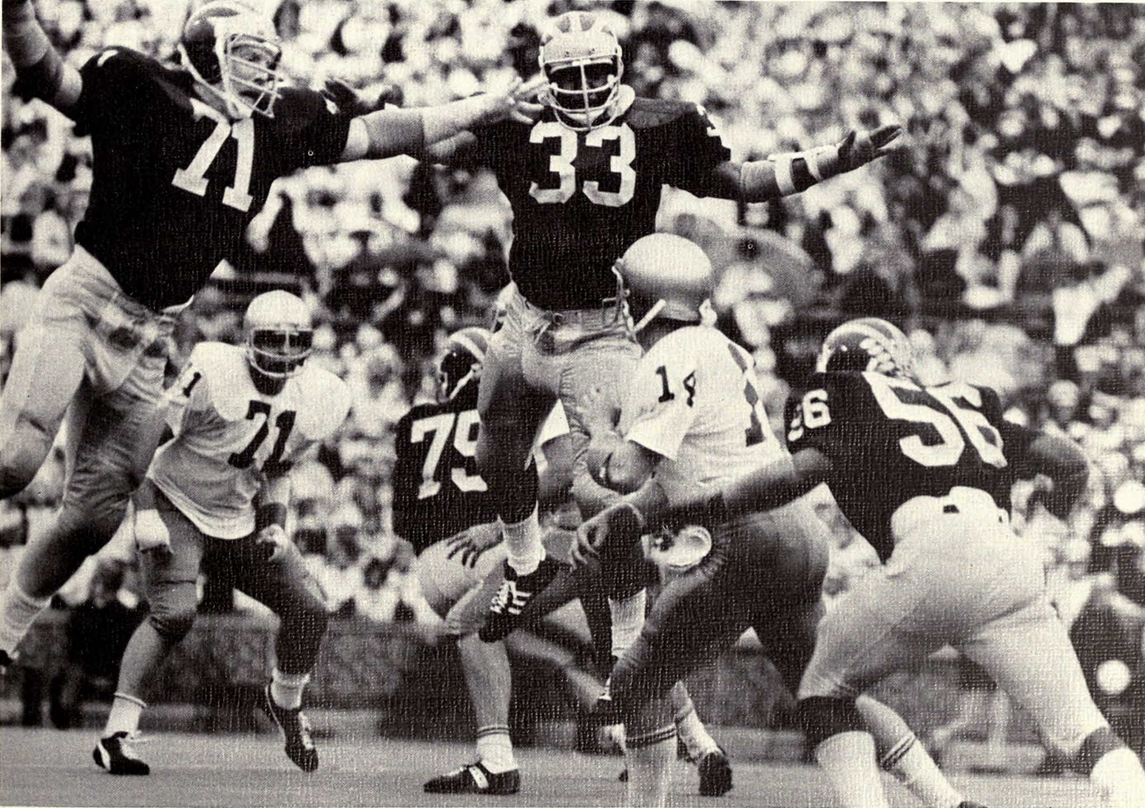
- Dave Gallagher and Russ (#33) in 1973

No. 59, 53, 57
- Position: Linebacker

Personal information
- Born: February 16, 1953 (age 73); Muskegon, Michigan, U.S.
- Listed height: 6 ft 2 in (1.88 m)
- Listed weight: 227 lb (103 kg)

Career information
- High school: Muskegon Heights
- College: Michigan
- NFL draft: 1975: 13th round, 315th overall pick

Career history
- Atlanta Falcons (1975); New York Jets (1976–1977)

Career NFL statistics
- Fumble recoveries: 1
- Stats at Pro Football Reference

James Carlton Russ (born February 16, 1953) is an American former professional football player who was a linebacker for the Atlanta Falcons and New York Jets of the National Football League (NFL) from 1975 to 1977. He played college football for the Michigan Wolverines from 1972 to 1974.

== Early life ==
Russ was born in 1953 in Muskegon, Michigan. He attended Muskegon Heights High School where he competed in three sports.

== Michigan ==
Though recruited to play for the Indiana Hoosiers football team, Russ enrolled at the University of Michigan in 1971 without a football scholarship. He tried out for the Wolverines as a walk-on and played for Michigan's all-freshman team in 1971. He went on to become a backup in 1972.

As a junior in 1973, he started all 11 games at the wide linebacker position for the undefeated 1973 Michigan Wolverines football team that held its opponents to an average of 6.2 points per game and finished the season ranked No. 6 in both the AP and UPI polls. Russ tallied 66 tackles during the 1973 season, including 11 against Navy and a career-high 15 tackles in a 10-10 tie with Ohio State.

As a senior, Russ started 9 of 11 games at the wide linebacker position for the 1974 Michigan Wolverines football team that held its opponents to an average of 6.8 points per game and finished the season ranked No. 3 in the AP poll and No. 5 in the UPI poll.

During his two years as the starting wide linebacker at Michigan, the team compiled a record of 20-1-1. Russ concluded his collegiate career with a total of 118 tackles for the Wolverines.

== Professional football ==
Russ was selected by the Atlanta Falcons in the 13th round (315th overall pick) of the 1975 NFL draft. As a rookie in 1975, Russ was a backup for Tommy Nobis, but he appeared in 14 games. Russ was released by the Falcons in early September 1976.

Russ was acquired on waivers by the New York Jets after being released by the Falcons. Jets' coach Lou Holtz acquired Russ to start in place of Steve Poole, who had been injured. Russ appeared in three games for the Jets in September 1976, two of them as a starter, but he sustained a knee injury in a game against the Miami Dolphins. As a result of the injury, Russ missed the remainder of the 1976 season and underwent knee surgery during the offseason. Russ returned to the Jets in 1977, but he was released in early September. He was re-signed by the Jets in late October 1977 and appeared in two games during the 1977 season.

Russ was released by the Jets after the 1977 season and signed with the Washington Redskins in January 1978.

== Later life ==
In 1994, Russ was inducted into the Muskegon Area Sports Hall of Fame.
