= 1974 Iowa Hawkeyes football team =

American college football season

1974 Iowa Hawkeyes football
- Conference: Big Ten Conference
- Record: 3–8 (2–6 Big Ten)
- Head coach: Bob Commings (1st season)
- Offensive coordinator: Howard Vernon (2nd season)
- Defensive coordinator: Larry Coyer (1st season)
- MVP: Rob Fick
- Captains: Dan McCarney; Earl Douthitt
- Home stadium: Kinnick Stadium

1974 Big Ten Conference football standings
	Conf.					Overall
Team	W		L		T	W		L		T
No. 3 Michigan +	7	–	1	–	0	10	–	1	–	0
No. 4 Ohio State +	7	–	1	–	0	10	–	2	–	0
No. 12 Michigan State	6	–	1	–	1	7	–	3	–	1
Wisconsin	5	–	3	–	0	7	–	4	–	0
Illinois	4	–	3	–	1	6	–	4	–	1
Purdue	3	–	5	–	0	4	–	6	–	1
Minnesota	2	–	6	–	0	4	–	7	–	0
Iowa	2	–	6	–	0	3	–	8	–	0
Northwestern	2	–	6	–	0	3	–	8	–	0
Indiana	1	–	7	–	0	1	–	10	–	0
+ – Conference co-champions; Rankings from AP Poll

The 1974 Iowa Hawkeyes football team was an American football team that represented the University of Iowa as a member of the Big Ten Conference during the 1974 Big Ten football season. In their first year under head coach Bob Commings, the Hawkeyes compiled a 3–8 record (2–6 in conference games), finished in a three-way tie for seventh place in the Big Ten, and were outscored by a total of 308 to 157.

The 1974 Hawkeyes gained 1,982 rushing yards and 1,193 passing yards. On defense, they gave up 3,180 rushing yards and 723 passing yards.

The team's statistical leaders included quarterback Robert Fick (79-of-165 passing, 1,059 yards), running back Jim Jensen (659 rushing yards), Bill Schultz (25 receptions for 432 yards), Rod Wellington (30 points scored), and Dan LeFleur (115 total tackles). Defensive back Earl Douthitt received first-team honors on the 1974 All-Big Ten Conference football team. Douthitt and offensive guard Dan McCarney were the team captains. Fick was selected as the team's most valuable player.

The team played its home games at Kinnick Stadium in Iowa City, Iowa. Home attendance totaled 291,600, an average of 48,600 per game.

== Schedule ==
Date	Opponent	Site	Result	Attendance	Source
September 14	at No. 6 Michigan	Michigan Stadium; Ann Arbor, MI	L 7–24	76,802	
September 21	No. 12 UCLA*	Kinnick Stadium; Iowa City, IA	W 21–10	47,500	
September 28	No. 19 Penn State*	Kinnick Stadium; Iowa City, IA	L 0–27	46,500	
October 5	at No. 9 USC*	Los Angeles Memorial Coliseum; Los Angeles, CA	L 3–41	52,095	
October 12	Northwestern^{†}	Kinnick Stadium; Iowa City, IA	W 35–10	51,200	
October 19	at Minnesota	Memorial Stadium; Minneapolis, MN (rivalry)	L 17–23	48,579	
October 26	Illinois	Kinnick Stadium; Iowa City, IA	W 14–12	49,400	
November 2	at Purdue	Ross–Ade Stadium; West Lafayette, IN	L 14–38	51,107	
November 9	Wisconsin	Kinnick Stadium; Iowa City, IA	L 15–28	48,300	
November 16	No. 4 Ohio State	Kinnick Stadium; Iowa City, IA	L 10–35	48,700	
November 23	at No. 14 Michigan State	Spartan Stadium; East Lansing, MI	L 21–60	51,002	
*Non-conference game; ^{†}Homecoming; Rankings from AP Poll released prior to the game

== Game summaries ==
=== At Michigan ===
Iowa at Michigan

Team	1	2	3	4	Total
Hawkeyes	0	0	0	7	7
• No. 6 Wolverines	7	7	10	0	24

- Date: September 14
- Location:
  Michigan Stadium
  Ann Arbor, MI
- Game attendance: 76,802
- Game weather: Sunny

Scoring summary
1	Mich	Chuck Heater 2-yard run (Mike Lantry kick)	Michigan 7–0
2	Mich	Mark Elzinga 2-yard run (Mike Lantry kick)	Michigan 14–0
3	Mich	Chapman 10-yard pass from Mark Elzinga	Michigan 21–0
3	Mich	Mike Lantry 30-yard field goal	Michigan 24–0
4	Iowa	Rod Wellington 1-yard field run (kick)	Michigan 24–7

=== UCLA ===
The victory over the 12th ranked Bruins snapped a 12-game losing streak and was only Iowa's second win in its last 19 games.

== Roster ==
1974 Iowa Hawkeyes football team roster
Players
Coaches
Offense

Pos.	#	Name	Class
OL	72	Joe Devlin	Jr
FB	48	Mark Fetter	Jr
QB	17	Butch Caldwell (injured)	Jr
QB	15	Rob Fick	Sr
RB		Tom Grine	So
RB	22	Jim Jensen	Jr
OL	60	Dan McCarney	Sr
QB	9	Bobby Ousley
RB	41	Rod Wellington

Defense

Pos.	#	Name	Class
LB	20	Andre Jackson	Jr
DB	21	Jim Caldwell	So
DB	46	Earl Douthitt	Sr

Special teams

Pos.	#	Name	Class
P		Joe Heppner
K		Nick Quartaro	So

Head coach

- Bob Commings

Coordinators/assistant coaches

- Howard Vernon – Offensive Coordinator
- Larry Coyer – Defensive Coordinator
- Dave Beckman – Offensive line
- Kent Stephenson – Offensive line
- Dennis Green – Running backs
- Bill Whisler – Defensive line
- Dan McDonald – Defensive tackles
- Tom Cecchini – Linebackers
- Bernie Wyatt – Defensive ends

Legend

- (C) Team captain
- (S) Suspended
- (I) Ineligible
- Injured
- Redshirt

== Team players in the 1975 NFL draft ==
Player	Position	Round	Pick	NFL club
Earl Douthitt	Defensive back	7	178	Chicago Bears
