= 1974 Michigan State Spartans football team =

American college football season

1974 Michigan State Spartans football
- Conference: Big Ten Conference

Ranking
- Coaches: No. 18
- AP: No. 12
- Record: 7–3–1 (6–1–1 Big Ten)
- Head coach: Denny Stolz (2nd season)
- Offensive coordinator: Andy MacDonald (2nd season)
- MVP: Charlie Baggett
- Captains: Clarence Bullock; James Tauber
- Home stadium: Spartan Stadium

1974 Big Ten Conference football standings
	Conf.					Overall
Team	W		L		T	W		L		T
No. 3 Michigan +	7	–	1	–	0	10	–	1	–	0
No. 4 Ohio State +	7	–	1	–	0	10	–	2	–	0
No. 12 Michigan State	6	–	1	–	1	7	–	3	–	1
Wisconsin	5	–	3	–	0	7	–	4	–	0
Illinois	4	–	3	–	1	6	–	4	–	1
Purdue	3	–	5	–	0	4	–	6	–	1
Minnesota	2	–	6	–	0	4	–	7	–	0
Iowa	2	–	6	–	0	3	–	8	–	0
Northwestern	2	–	6	–	0	3	–	8	–	0
Indiana	1	–	7	–	0	1	–	10	–	0
+ – Conference co-champions; Rankings from AP Poll

The 1974 Michigan State Spartans football team was an American football team that represented Michigan State University as a member of the Big Ten Conference during the 1974 Big Ten football season. In their second season under head coach Denny Stolz, the Spartans compiled a 7–3–1 record (6–1–1 in conference games), finished in third place in the Big Ten, and outscored opponents by a total of 270 to 196. In the final college football polls, they were ranked No. 12 by the AP (writers) and No. 18 by the UPI (coaches). In four games against ranked opponents, the Spartans lost to No. 7 Notre Dame and No. 4 Michigan, and defeated No. 20 Wisconsin and No. 1 Ohio State.

On offense, the Spartans gained an average of 269.2 rushing yards and 87.2 passing yards per game. On defense, they gave up 202.1 rushing yards and 107.0 passing yards per game. The individual statistical leaders included quarterback Charlie Baggett with 965 passing yards, Levi Jackson with 942 rushing yards, and split end Mike Hurd with 18 receptions and 373 receiving yards. Baggett was selected as the team's most valuable player.

Seven Michigan State players were selected by the Associated Press (AP) and/or the United Press International (UPI) as first- or second-team players on the 1974 All-Big Ten Conference football team: Otto Smith at defensive end (AP-1, UPI-1); Terrence McClowry at linebacker (AP-1, UPI-1); James Taubert at defensive tackle (AP-2, UPI-1); Levi Jackson at running back (UPI-1); Greg Schaum at defensive tackle (AP-2, UPI-2); Charlie Ane at center (AP-2); and Tom Graves at defensive back (AP-2).

The team played its home games at Spartan Stadium in East Lansing, Michigan.

== Schedule ==
Date	Opponent	Rank	Site	TV	Result	Attendance	Source
September 14	Northwestern		Spartan Stadium; East Lansing, MI		W 41–7	49,103	
September 21	Syracuse*		Spartan Stadium; East Lansing, MI		W 19–0	66,847	
September 28	at UCLA*		Los Angeles Memorial Coliseum; Los Angeles, CA		L 14–56	44,026	
October 5	No. 7 Notre Dame*		Spartan Stadium; East Lansing, MI (rivalry)		L 14–19	77,431	
October 12	at No. 4 Michigan		Michigan Stadium; Ann Arbor, MI (rivalry)		L 7–21	104,682	
October 19	at Illinois		Memorial Stadium; Champaign, IL		T 21–21	55,677	
October 26	Purdue^{†}		Spartan Stadium; East Lansing, MI		W 31–7	63,321	
November 2	at No. 20 Wisconsin		Camp Randall Stadium; Madison, WI		W 28–21	78,848	
November 9	No. 1 Ohio State		Spartan Stadium; East Lansing, MI	ABC	W 16–13	78,533	
November 16	at Indiana	No. 15	Memorial Stadium; Bloomington, IN (rivalry)		W 19–10	25,492	
November 23	Iowa	No. 14	Spartan Stadium; East Lansing, MI		W 60–21	51,002	
*Non-conference game; ^{†}Homecoming; Rankings from AP Poll released prior to the game

== Game summaries ==
=== Michigan ===
Team	1	2	3	4	Total
Michigan State	0	0	0	7	7
• Michigan	7	14	0	0	21

- Date: October 12
- Location: Michigan Stadium, Ann Arbor, Michigan
- Game attendance: 104,682

Scoring summary
1	MICH	Bell 13-yard run (Lantry kick)	Michigan 7–0
2	MICH	Jilek recovered MSU fumble in end zone (Lantry kick)	Michigan 14–0
2	MICH	Smith 45-yard pass from Franklin (Lantry kick)	Michigan 21–0
4	MSU	Cobb 15-yard pass from Baggett (Nielsen kick)	Michigan 21–7

On October 12, 1974, Michigan State lost to Michigan by a 21-7 score. The game, played at Michigan Stadium, attracted a crowd of 104,682, reported to be "the second largest crowd in modern N.C.A.A. history" behind the 1973 Michigan-Ohio State game. Gordon Bell led Michigan's rushing attack with 73 yards on 16 carries, including a 13-yard touchdown run in the first quarter. Dennis Franklin completed five of nine passes for 84 yards, including a 45-yard touchdown pass to Jim Smith in the second quarter, but left the game in the third quarter with bruised ribs. Linebacker Dan Jilek also scored in the second quarter when he forced a fumble on a punt attempt and then recovered it in the end zone.

=== Ohio State ===
Michigan State manages a considerable upset at home, topping then #1 Ohio State, 16-13. Fullback Levi Jackson scores the final points of the game on an 88-yard TD run, followed by a Hans Neilsen point after touchdown. In a tumultuous finish, Ohio State fails to convert at the Spartans' 1-yard line as time expires. Big Ten Commissioner Wayne Duke went to referee Gene Calhoun and the team of officials to confirm that the Buckeyes had not attempted their second-down play before the clock ran out.

Team	1	2	3	4	Total
Ohio State	3	0	3	7	13
• Michigan State	0	3	0	13	16

- Date: November 9
- Location: Spartan Stadium, East Lansing, MI
- Game attendance: 78,533
- TV announcers (ABC): Chris Schenkel, Duffy Daugherty & Jim Lampley

Scoring summary
1		OSU	Tom Klaban field goal	OSU 3-0
2	0:03	MSU	Hans Nielsen 39 yard field goal	Tied 3-3
3		OSU	Tom Klaban field goal	OSU 6-3
4		OSU	Champ Henson 1 yard run (Klaban kick)	OSU 13-3
4		MSU	Mike Jones 44 yard pass from Charlie Baggett (pass failed)	OSU 13-9
4	3:17	MSU	Levi Jackson 88 yard run (Nielsen kick)	MSU 16-13

== Roster ==
1974 Michigan State Spartans football team roster
Players
Coaches
Offense

Pos.	#	Name	Class
QB		Charlie Baggett	So
TE		Mike Cobb	So
RB		Jim Earley	Fr
WR	21	Dane Fortney	Jr
FB		Levi Jackson

Defense

Pos.	#	Name	Class

Special teams

Pos.	#	Name	Class

Head coach

- Denny Stolz

Coordinators/assistant coaches

Legend

- (C) Team captain
- (S) Suspended
- (I) Ineligible
- Injured
- Redshirt

== See also ==
- 1974 in Michigan
