= 1974 Wisconsin Badgers football team =

American college football season

1974 Wisconsin Badgers football
- Conference: Big Ten Conference
- Record: 7–4 (5–3 Big Ten)
- Head coach: John Jardine (5th season)
- Offensive coordinator: Ellis Rainsberger (2nd season)
- Offensive scheme: I formation
- Defensive coordinator: Lew Stueck (2nd season)
- Base defense: 5–2
- MVP: Gregg Bohlig
- Captains: Gregg Bohlig; Mark Zakula
- Home stadium: Camp Randall Stadium

1974 Big Ten Conference football standings
	Conf.					Overall
Team	W		L		T	W		L		T
No. 3 Michigan +	7	–	1	–	0	10	–	1	–	0
No. 4 Ohio State +	7	–	1	–	0	10	–	2	–	0
No. 12 Michigan State	6	–	1	–	1	7	–	3	–	1
Wisconsin	5	–	3	–	0	7	–	4	–	0
Illinois	4	–	3	–	1	6	–	4	–	1
Purdue	3	–	5	–	0	4	–	6	–	1
Minnesota	2	–	6	–	0	4	–	7	–	0
Iowa	2	–	6	–	0	3	–	8	–	0
Northwestern	2	–	6	–	0	3	–	8	–	0
Indiana	1	–	7	–	0	1	–	10	–	0
+ – Conference co-champions; Rankings from AP Poll

The 1974 Wisconsin Badgers football team was an American football team that represented the University of Wisconsin as a member of the Big Ten Conference during the 1974 Big Ten season. In their fifth year under head coach John Jardine, the Badgers compiled a 7–4 record (5–3 in conference games), finished in fourth place in the Big Ten, and outscored opponents by a total of 341 to 243.

The Badgers gained an average of 112.4 passing yards and 287.5 rushing yards per game. On defense, they gave up an average of 118.6 passing yards and 220.1 rushing yards per game. The team's individual statistical leaders included: quarterback Gregg Bohlig (1,212 passing yards); running back Billy Marek (1,215 rushing yards); and wide receiver Jeff Mack (16 receptions for 353 yards).

Bohlig and Mark Zakula were the team captains. Bohlig was selected as the team's most valuable player. Five Wisconsin players received first- or second-team All-Big Ten honors from the Associated Press (AP) or United Press International (UPI): Marek at running back (AP-1, UPI-1); Dennis Lick at offensive tackle (AP-1, UPI-1); Jack Novak at end/receiver (AP-2, UPI-1); Terry Stieve at offensive guard (AP-2, UPI-2); and Rick Jakious at linebacker (AP-2).

The Badgers played their home games at Camp Randall Stadium in Madison, Wisconsin.

== Schedule ==
Date	Opponent	Rank	Site	Result	Attendance	Source
September 14	at Purdue		Ross–Ade Stadium; West Lafayette, IN	W 28–14	54,239	
September 21	No. 4 Nebraska*		Camp Randall Stadium; Madison, WI (rivalry)	W 21–20	73,381	
September 28	at Colorado*	No. 11	Folsom Field; Boulder, CO	L 21–24	50,512	
October 5	Missouri*		Camp Randall Stadium; Madison, WI	W 59–20	71,141	
October 12	at No. 1 Ohio State	No. 13	Ohio Stadium; Columbus, OH	L 7–52	87,717	
October 19	No. 3 Michigan		Camp Randall Stadium; Madison, WI	L 20–24	78,911	
October 26	at Indiana		Memorial Stadium; Bloomington, IN	W 35–25	31,453	
November 2	No. 20 Michigan State^{†}		Camp Randall Stadium; Madison, WI	L 21–28	78,848	
November 9	at Iowa		Kinnick Stadium; Iowa City, IA (rivalry)	W 28–15	48,300	
November 16	at Northwestern		Dyche Stadium; Evanston, IL	W 52–7	28,533	
November 23	Minnesota		Camp Randall Stadium; Madison, WI (rivalry)	W 49–14	55,869	
*Non-conference game; ^{†}Homecoming; Rankings from AP Poll released prior to the game

== Game summaries ==
=== Minnesota ===
- Billy Marek 304 rush yards, 5 TD

== Roster ==
1974 Wisconsin Badgers football team roster
Players
Coaches
Offense

Pos.	#	Name	Class
G	66	Mike Becker	Sr
TE	82	Tom Belter	Jr
QB	14	Gregg Bohlig (C)	Sr
FB	30	Larry Canada	So
TE	85	Ron Egloff	So
G	56	Kevin Gassner	Jr
FB	32	Gerald Gosa	Jr
OT	75	Bob Johnson	Sr
G	64	Rick Koeck	Sr
OT	70	Dennis Lick	Jr
OT	73	Guy LoCascio	Sr
G	63	Terry Lyons	So
WR	39	Jeff Mack	Sr
RB	33	Mike Morgan	Fr
RB	26	Billy Marek	Jr
C	53	Joe Norwick	Jr
TE	88	Jack Novak	Sr
RB	27	Ron Pollard	So
OT	78	John Reimer	Jr
WR	44	Randy Rose	So
WR	45	Art Sanger	Sr
FB	32	Ken Starch	Jr
G	68	Terry Stieve	Jr
RB	29	Selvie Washington	Sr
QB	3	Jeff White	Sr
C	51	Art Zeimetz	Sr

Defense

Pos.	#	Name	Class
DT	57	Dave Anderson	Jr
LB	92	Mike Benninger	Sr
DT	79	Bill Brandt	Jr
S	10	Terry Buss	Jr
DE	7	Pat Collins	So
S	11	Mark Cullen	Sr
DT	90	Gary Dickert	Sr
CB	4	Bill Drummond	Jr
DT	57	Bob Czechowicz	Fr
DB	4	Bill Drummond	Jr
LB	49	Jim Franz	Jr
DE	96	Randy Frokjer	Sr
MG	54	Mike Grice	Fr
DE	40	Bill Hazard	Sr
LB	34	Rick Jakious	Sr
MG	36	Mike Jenkins	Sr
DB	28	Rex Jones	Jr
DT	48	Bill Kazmaier	Jr
CB	12	Greg Lewis	Jr
CB	5	Tim McConnell	So
DT	62	Andy Michuda	So
S	13	Bob Mietz	Jr
CB	24	Alvin Peabody	Sr
DT	76	John Rasmussen	So
CB, P	8	Ken Simmons	Jr
DE	65	Mike Vesperman	Sr
S	6	Steve Wagner	Jr
S	21	Jim Wimpress	Sr
DE	47	Mark Zakula (C)	Sr
LB	50	John Zimmerman	Jr

Special teams

Pos.	#	Name	Class
K	1	Vladmir LaBun	Jr
K	2	Vince Lamia	So
CB, P	8	Ken Simmons	Jr
P	41	Stan Williams	Sr

Head coach

- John Jardine

Coordinators/assistant coaches

- Ellis Rainsberger – Offensive Coordinator
- Lew Stueck – Defensive Coordinator/Linebackers
- George Chryst – Offensive Line
- Bob Lee – Wide Receivers
- Charlie McBride – Offensive Line
- Dick Selcer – Defensive Backs
- Bob Spoo – Quarterbacks
- Dick Teteak – Defensive Line
- LaVern Van Dyke – Administrative Assistant

Legend

- (C) Team captain
- (S) Suspended
- (I) Ineligible
- Injured
- Redshirt

== 1975 NFL draft ==
Player	Position	Round	Pick	NFL club
Jack Novak	Tight end	12	301	Cincinnati Bengals
