= 1974 Purdue Boilermakers football team =

American college football season

1974 Purdue Boilermakers football
- Conference: Big Ten Conference
- Record: 4–6–1 (3–5 Big Ten)
- Head coach: Alex Agase (2nd season)
- MVP: Larry Burton
- Captains: Fred Cooper; Ralph Perretta
- Home stadium: Ross–Ade Stadium

1974 Big Ten Conference football standings
	Conf.					Overall
Team	W		L		T	W		L		T
No. 3 Michigan +	7	–	1	–	0	10	–	1	–	0
No. 4 Ohio State +	7	–	1	–	0	10	–	2	–	0
No. 12 Michigan State	6	–	1	–	1	7	–	3	–	1
Wisconsin	5	–	3	–	0	7	–	4	–	0
Illinois	4	–	3	–	1	6	–	4	–	1
Purdue	3	–	5	–	0	4	–	6	–	1
Minnesota	2	–	6	–	0	4	–	7	–	0
Iowa	2	–	6	–	0	3	–	8	–	0
Northwestern	2	–	6	–	0	3	–	8	–	0
Indiana	1	–	7	–	0	1	–	10	–	0
+ – Conference co-champions; Rankings from AP Poll

The 1974 Purdue Boilermakers football team represented Purdue University in the 1974 Big Ten Conference football season. Led by second-year head coach Alex Agase, the Boilermakers compiled an overall record of 4–6–1 with a mark of 3–5 in conference play, placing sixth in the Big Ten. Purdue played home games at Ross–Ade Stadium in West Lafayette, Indiana.

== Schedule ==
Date	Opponent	Site	Result	Attendance	Source
September 14	Wisconsin	Ross–Ade Stadium; West Lafayette, IN	L 14–28	54,239	
September 21	Miami (OH)*	Ross–Ade Stadium; West Lafayette, IN	T 7–7	55,322	
September 28	at No. 2 Notre Dame*	Notre Dame Stadium; Notre Dame, IN (rivalry)	W 31–20	59,075	
October 5	at Duke*	Wallace Wade Stadium; Durham, NC	L 14–16	20,500	
October 12	Illinois^{†}	Ross–Ade Stadium; West Lafayette, Indiana (rivalry)	L 23–27	63,174	
October 19	at Northwestern	Dyche Stadium; Evanston, IL	W 31–26	27,557	
October 26	at Michigan State	Spartan Stadium; East Lansing, MI	L 7–31	63,321	
November 2	Iowa	Ross–Ade Stadium; West Lafayette, IN	W 38–14	51,107	
November 9	Minnesota	Ross–Ade Stadium; West Lafayette, IN	L 20–24	51,374	
November 16	at No. 3 Michigan	Michigan Stadium; Ann Arbor, MI	L 0–51	88,902	
November 23	Indiana	Ross–Ade Stadium; West Lafayette, IN (Old Oaken Bucket)	W 38–17	63,637	
*Non-conference game; ^{†}Homecoming; Rankings from AP Poll released prior to the game

== Game summaries ==
=== Notre Dame ===
Team	1	2	3	4	Total
• Purdue	24	0	0	7	31
Notre Dame	0	7	7	6	20

- Date: September 28
- Location: Notre Dame Stadium, South Bend, Indiana

Scoring summary
1	Purdue	Terrizzi 1-yard run (Schmidt kick)	Purdue 7-0
1	Purdue	Gross 52-yard run (Schmidt kick)	Purdue 14-0
1	Purdue	Mannella 21-yard interception return (Schmidt kick)	Purdue 21-0
1	Purdue	Schmidt 47-yard field goal	Purdue 24-0
2	Notre Dame	Bullock 1-yard run (Reeve kick)	Purdue 24-7
3	Notre Dame	Bullock 1-yard run (Reeve kick)	Purdue 24-14
4	Purdue	Northington 6-yard run (Schmidt kick)	Purdue 31-14
4	Notre Dame	Demmerle 29-yard pass from Clements (pass failed)	Purdue 31-20

=== Duke ===
- Scott Dierking 19 rushes, 122 yards

=== Northwestern ===
Team	1	2	3	4	Total
• Purdue	6	8	17	0	31
Northwestern	0	7	7	12	26

- Date: October 19
- Location: Dyche Stadium, Evanston, Illinois
- Game attendance: 27,557

Scoring summary
1	Purdue	Vitali 1-yard run (kick failed)	Purdue 6-0
2	Northwestern	McNamara 12-yard pass from Anderson (Blazevich kick)	Northwestern 7-6
2	Purdue	Vitali 1-yard run (Vitali pass from Terrizzi)	Purdue 14-7
3	Purdue	Dierking 4-yard run (Schmidt kick)	Purdue 21-7
3	Northwestern	Pooler 13-yard run (Blazevich kick)	Purdue 21-14
3	Purdue	Schmidt 44-yard field goal	Purdue 24-14
3	Purdue	Vitali 5-yard run (Schmidt kick)	Purdue 31-14
4	Northwestern	Pooler 1-yard run (pass failed)	Purdue 31-20
4	Northwestern	Pooler 1-yard run (pass failed)	Purdue 31-26

Scott Dierking 24 rushes, 127 yards

=== Iowa ===
- Mike Pruitt 10 rushes, 179 yards

=== Indiana ===
- Scott Dierking 19 rushes, 129 yards

== Roster ==
1974 Purdue Boilermakers football team roster
Players
Coaches
Offense

Pos.	#	Name	Class
WR		Reggie Arnold
WR		Paul Beery
RB		Tim Boykin
WR	22	Larry Burton	Sr
RB		Scott Dierking
OL		Tom Gibson
RB		Pete Gross
G	77	Ken Long	Jr
QB		Craig Nagel
RB		Mike Northington
WR		Errol Patterson
G	69	Ralph Perretta	Sr
OL		Jim Polak
FB	38	Mike Pruitt	Jr
TE		Barry Santini
OL		Jeff Stapleton
QB		Michael Terrizzi
QB		Mark Vitali
TE		Nigel Wirgowski
OL		Connie Zelencik

Defense

Pos.	#	Name	Class
DB		Tom Andres
DB	42	Fred Cooper	Sr
DB		Alex DiMarzio
DL		Mark Gorgal
DL		Ron Hardy
DB		Pat Harris
DB		Dwight Lewis
LB		Bob Manella
DT	74	Ken Novak	Jr
DL		Rick Oliver
DL		Stan Parker
DL		Roger Ruwe
DL		Blane Smith
LB		Joe Sullivan
DB		Antjony Thompson
DB		Jim Wood

Special teams

Pos.	#	Name	Class
K	1	Frank Conner	Jr

Head coach

- Alex Agase

Coordinators/assistant coaches

- Fred Conti
- Jerry Hartman
- Rick Venturi
- Jack Ellis
- Mike Wynn
- Pat Naughton
- Bob Geiger
- Tom Roggeman
- George Catavolos

Legend

- (C) Team captain
- (S) Suspended
- (I) Ineligible
- Injured
- Redshirt
