= 1974 Minnesota Golden Gophers football team =

American college football season

1974 Minnesota Golden Gophers football
- Conference: Big Ten Conference
- Record: 4–7 (2–6 Big Ten)
- Head coach: Cal Stoll (3rd season)
- MVP: Ollie Bakken
- Captains: Ollie Bakken; Jeff Selleck
- Home stadium: Memorial Stadium

1974 Big Ten Conference football standings
	Conf.					Overall
Team	W		L		T	W		L		T
No. 3 Michigan +	7	–	1	–	0	10	–	1	–	0
No. 4 Ohio State +	7	–	1	–	0	10	–	2	–	0
No. 12 Michigan State	6	–	1	–	1	7	–	3	–	1
Wisconsin	5	–	3	–	0	7	–	4	–	0
Illinois	4	–	3	–	1	6	–	4	–	1
Purdue	3	–	5	–	0	4	–	6	–	1
Minnesota	2	–	6	–	0	4	–	7	–	0
Iowa	2	–	6	–	0	3	–	8	–	0
Northwestern	2	–	6	–	0	3	–	8	–	0
Indiana	1	–	7	–	0	1	–	10	–	0
+ – Conference co-champions; Rankings from AP Poll

The 1974 Minnesota Golden Gophers football team represented the University of Minnesota in the 1974 Big Ten Conference football season. In their third year under head coach Cal Stoll, the Golden Gophers compiled a 4–7 record and were outscored by their opponents by a combined total of 332 to 161.

Linebacker Ollie Bakken received the team's Most Valuable Player award. Tackle Keith Simons was named All-Big Ten first team. Bakken and wide receiver Rick Upchurch were named All-Big Ten second team.

Total attendance for the season was 225,127, which averaged to 37,521. The season high for attendance was against rival Iowa.

== Schedule ==
Date	Opponent	Site	Result	Attendance	Source
September 14	No. 4 Ohio State	Memorial Stadium; Minneapolis, MN	L 19–34	45,511	
September 21	North Dakota*	Memorial Stadium; Minneapolis, MN	W 42–30	34,870	
September 28	TCU*	Memorial Stadium; Minneapolis, MN	W 9–7	32,822	
October 5	at No. 6 Nebraska*	Memorial Stadium; Lincoln, NE (rivalry)	L 0–54	76,408	
October 12	at Indiana	Memorial Stadium; Bloomington, IN	L 3–34	34,102	
October 19	Iowa^{†}	Memorial Stadium; Minneapolis, MN (rivalry)	W 23–17	48,579	
October 26	at No. 3 Michigan	Michigan Stadium; Ann Arbor, MI (Little Brown Jug)	L 0–49	96,284	
November 2	Northwestern	Memorial Stadium; Minneapolis, MN	L 13–21	32,922	
November 9	at Purdue	Ross–Ade Stadium; West Lafayette, IN	W 24–20	51,374	
November 16	Illinois	Memorial Stadium; Minneapolis, MN	L 14–17	31,423	
November 23	at Wisconsin	Camp Randall Stadium; Madison, WI (rivalry)	L 14–49	55,869	
*Non-conference game; ^{†}Homecoming; Rankings from AP Poll released prior to the game

== Game summaries ==
=== Ohio State ===
#4 Ohio State Buckeyes (0–0) at Minnesota Golden Gophers (0–0)

Quarter	1	2	3	4	Total
Ohio St	7	14	7	6	34
Minnesota	3	0	0	16	19

at Memorial Stadium, Minneapolis, Minnesota

- Date: September 14, 1974
- Game weather: Sunny • 69 °F (21 °C) • Wind 18 miles per hour (29 km/h; 16 kn)
- Game attendance: 45,511

Game information

First quarter

- OSU – Archie Griffin 10-yard run (Tom Skladany kick), 9:31. Ohio St 7–0. Drive: 11 plays, 77 yards.
- MINN – Steve Goldberg 52-yard field goal, 1:56. Ohio St 7–3. Drive:

Second quarter

- OSU – Pete Johnson 4-yard run (Tom Skladany kick), 12:59. Ohio St 14–3. Drive: 9 plays, 73 yards.
- OSU – Champ Henson 36-yard run (Tom Skladany kick), 9:25. Ohio St 21–3. Drive: 4 plays, 59 yards.

Third quarter

- OSU – Cornelius Greene 1-yard run (Tom Skladany kick), 11:26. Ohio St 28–3. Drive: 6 plays, 38 yards.

Fourth quarter 3

- MINN – Rick Upchurch 36-yard run (pass good), 9:29. Ohio St 28–11. Drive: 3 plays, 65 yards.
- MINN – Tony Dungy 6-yard run (pass good), 5:14. Ohio St 28–19. Drive: 5 plays, 16 yards.
- OSU – Cornelius Greene 57-yard run (kick failed), 1:17. Ohio St 34–19. Drive: 9 plays, 86 yards.

Top passers

- OSU – Cornelius Greene – 9/12, 136 yards
- MINN – Tony Dungy – 5/19, 71 yards, INT

Top rushers

- OSU – Archie Griffin – 26 rushes, 133 yards, TD
- MINN – Rick Upchurch – 13 rushes, 107 yards, TD

Top receivers

- OSU – Dave Hazel – 3 receptions, 63 yards
- MINN – Rick Upchurch – 3 receptions, 50 yards

Steve Goldberg broke his own school record for longest field goal in the first quarter.

== Roster ==
1974 Minnesota Golden Gophers football team roster
Players
Coaches
Offense

Pos.	#	Name	Class
RB		Sam Brady
QB		Tony Dungy
WR		Vince Fuller
OL		Brien Harvey
OL		Dale Hegland
TE		Dale Henrickson
RB		John Jones
WR		Mike Jones
WR		Ron Kullas
RB		John Matthews
OL		Art Meadowcraft
QB		Steve Olsen
RB		Jim Perkins
RB		Dexter Pride
TE		Scott Putchel
OL		Jeff Selleck
OL		Greg Shoff
WR		Bill Sims
QB		Marc Trestman
RB	40	Rick Upchurch	Sr

Defense

Pos.	#	Name	Class
DB		George Adzick
DB		Tommie Ash
LB		Ollie Bakken
DB	22	Doug Beaudoin	Jr
DL		Mike Byrne
DB		Greg Engebos
LB		Greg Gerths
DB		Orville Gilmore
DB		Kirby Kulenski
DL		Mike Ramerth
DL		Keith Simons
DL		Jeff Smith
DL		George Washington
DB		Bobby Weber

Special teams

Pos.	#	Name	Class
K		Steve Goldberg
P		Frank Mosko

Head coach

- Cal Stoll

Coordinators/assistant coaches

Legend

- (C) Team captain
- (S) Suspended
- (I) Ineligible
- Injured
- Redshirt
