= 1974 Indiana Hoosiers football team =

American college football season

1974 Indiana Hoosiers football
- Conference: Big Ten Conference
- Record: 1–10 (1–7 Big Ten)
- Head coach: Lee Corso (2nd season)
- MVP: Donnie Thomas
- Captains: Bill Atkinson; Tim Mills
- Home stadium: Memorial Stadium

1974 Big Ten Conference football standings
	Conf.					Overall
Team	W		L		T	W		L		T
No. 3 Michigan +	7	–	1	–	0	10	–	1	–	0
No. 4 Ohio State +	7	–	1	–	0	10	–	2	–	0
No. 12 Michigan State	6	–	1	–	1	7	–	3	–	1
Wisconsin	5	–	3	–	0	7	–	4	–	0
Illinois	4	–	3	–	1	6	–	4	–	1
Purdue	3	–	5	–	0	4	–	6	–	1
Minnesota	2	–	6	–	0	4	–	7	–	0
Iowa	2	–	6	–	0	3	–	8	–	0
Northwestern	2	–	6	–	0	3	–	8	–	0
Indiana	1	–	7	–	0	1	–	10	–	0
+ – Conference co-champions; Rankings from AP Poll

The 1974 Indiana Hoosiers football team represented the Indiana Hoosiers in the 1974 Big Ten Conference football season. They participated as members of the Big Ten Conference. The Hoosiers played their home games at Memorial Stadium in Bloomington, Indiana. The team was coached by Lee Corso, in his second year as head coach of the Hoosiers.

== Schedule ==
Date	Opponent	Site	Result	Attendance	Source
September 14	at Illinois	Memorial Stadium; Champaign, IL (rivalry)	L 0–16	40,911	
September 21	No. 17 Arizona*	Memorial Stadium; Bloomington, IN	L 20–35	35,683	
September 28	at Kentucky*	Commonwealth Stadium; Lexington, KY (rivalry)	L 22–28	56,000	
October 5	West Virginia*	Memorial Stadium; Bloomington, IN	L 0–24	30,153	
October 12	Minnesota^{†}	Memorial Stadium; Bloomington, IN	W 34–3	34,102	
October 19	at No. 1 Ohio State	Ohio Stadium; Columbus, OH	L 9–49	87,671	
October 26	Wisconsin	Memorial Stadium; Bloomington, IN	L 25–35	31,453	
November 2	No. 3 Michigan	Memorial Stadium; Bloomington, IN	L 7–21	32,873	
November 9	at Northwestern	Dyche Stadium; Evanston, IL	L 22–24	25,382	
November 16	No. 15 Michigan State	Memorial Stadium; Bloomington, IN (rivalry)	L 10–19	25,492	
November 23	at Purdue	Ross–Ade Stadium; West Lafayette, IN (Old Oaken Bucket)	L 17–38	63,637	
*Non-conference game; ^{†}Homecoming; Rankings from AP Poll released prior to the game

== 1975 NFL draftees ==
Player	Position	Round	Pick	NFL club
Larry Jameson	Defensive tackle	6	152	St. Louis Cardinals
