= Dennis Franks =

American football player (1953–2021)

No. 53, 58
- Position: Center

Personal information
- Born: May 29, 1953; McKeesport, Pennsylvania, U.S.
- Died: October 16, 2021 (aged 68)
- Listed height: 6 ft 1 in (1.85 m)
- Listed weight: 241 lb (109 kg)

Career information
- High school: Bethel Park (Bethel Park, Pennsylvania)
- College: Michigan
- NFL draft: 1975: undrafted

Career history
- Philadelphia Eagles (1976–1978); Detroit Lions (1979)

Awards and highlights
- First-team All-Big Ten (1974)

Career NFL statistics
- Games played: 57
- Games started: 2
- Stats at Pro Football Reference

Dennis John Franks (May 29, 1953 – October 16, 2021) was an American professional football player in the National Football League (NFL). He was a center and played on special teams for the Philadelphia Eagles from 1976 to 1978 and for the Detroit Lions in 1979. He played college football at the University of Michigan from 1972 to 1974. He was the starting center in all 11 games for the 1974 Michigan Wolverines football team that began its season with ten consecutive wins before losing to Ohio State 10–12 in the final game of the season. Franks was selected as a first-team All-Big Ten Conference center in 1974.

== Early life ==
Franks was born in McKeesport, Pennsylvania, on May 29, 1953. He grew up in Bethel Park, Pennsylvania, a suburb of Pittsburgh, and attended Bethel Park High School. Franks was recruited by Woody Hayes to attend Ohio State, including three home visits by Hayes, but Franks chose to play football at the University of Michigan for Bo Schembechler.

== College football ==
Franks attended the University of Michigan on a football scholarship. As a freshman in 1971, he played on the all-freshman team. As a sophomore, he was the backup for starting center Bill Hart. As a junior, Franks started 5 of 11 games at center for the undefeated 1973 Michigan Wolverines football team.

As a senior, Franks started all 11 games at center for the 1974 Michigan team that began its season with ten consecutive wins before losing to Ohio State by a 12–10 score in the final game of the season. Franks was selected as a first-team All-Big Ten Conference player 1974. Head coach Bo Schembechler said of Franks: "He's the best center I've seen around so far. He may be a little better than Guy Murdock – a little better and a little quicker. He's consistent."

While playing football at Michigan, Franks drew press attention for his hobby of figure skating. His mother had been a figure skating champion in Germany, and he noted: "The figure skating is a great help for me in developing agility, versatility, quickness, and strength in my legs."

== Professional football ==
Franks was not selected in the 1975 NFL draft. Franks later recalled, "The computers said I was too small. I just didn't believe the computers." He tried out with the Philadelphia Eagles and Oakland Raiders in 1975, but both teams cut him during training camp. He tried out with the Eagles again in 1976 and made the team. As a rookie, he appeared in 14 games for the Eagles as a special teams player. During the 1977 season, Franks was given the opportunity to play at the center position. Following an injury to the team's starting center Guy Morriss, Franks played one game as the Eagles' starting center.

Franks was waived by the Eagles in August 1979. He had played for the Eagles for three years from 1976 to 1978, appearing in a total of 44 games. The Philadelphia Inquirer later summarized Franks' career as follows: "For the Eagles, Dennis Franks was a bit player who made himself important to the team by sheer force of personality. He was gung-ho, articulate and hard-working. Whatever coach Dick Vermeil wanted him to do, whether it was to fill in at an unusual position or work out year after year just to sit on the bench, Franks never lost his enthusiasm for the game or the team. His attitude may have been his most important team contribution."

In September 1979, Franks signed to play for the Detroit Lions. The Lions announced that they would use him as the center on punts and on special teams. Franks appeared in 13 games for the Lions during the 1979 NFL season.

== Later life ==
After retiring from football, Franks worked for Cambridge Diet Company, a company providing diet services to Philadelphia area residents.

In August 1987, Franks was indicted on federal drug charges as part of a so-called "Yuppie" drug ring allegedly operated by a Philadelphia dentist from 1981 to 1983. In September 1987, Franks pleaded guilty to distributing cocaine and conspiring to distribute cocaine. He admitted that he had participated in a drug ring that had sold cocaine to Philadelphia Eagles football players. In November 1988, Franks was "spared a prison sentence" and instead was ordered to spend 52 weekends in a community treatment facility, allowing him to continue with his job in Monterey, California, where he had moved.

In 1999, Franks was one of the first group to be inducted into the Bethel Park High School Hall of Fame.

Franks was later employed as an executive vice president at Market America, an Internet marketing and product brokerage company. At Market America, he helped develop the company's "Mall Without Walls" and supported its "health professional program, nutraMetrix" and its weight management program, "Transitions Lifestyle System".

Franks was married to Nancy until his death. Together, they had two daughters: Lauren and Katie. He died on October 16, 2021, at the age of 68.
