= 1974 Illinois Fighting Illini football team =

American college football season

1974 Illinois Fighting Illini football
- Conference: Big Ten Conference
- Record: 6–4–1 (4–3–1 Big Ten)
- Head coach: Bob Blackman (4th season)
- MVPs: Tom Hicks; Jeff Hollenbach
- Captains: Ty McMillin; Revie Sorey
- Home stadium: Memorial Stadium

1974 Big Ten Conference football standings
	Conf.					Overall
Team	W		L		T	W		L		T
No. 3 Michigan +	7	–	1	–	0	10	–	1	–	0
No. 4 Ohio State +	7	–	1	–	0	10	–	2	–	0
No. 12 Michigan State	6	–	1	–	1	7	–	3	–	1
Wisconsin	5	–	3	–	0	7	–	4	–	0
Illinois	4	–	3	–	1	6	–	4	–	1
Purdue	3	–	5	–	0	4	–	6	–	1
Minnesota	2	–	6	–	0	4	–	7	–	0
Iowa	2	–	6	–	0	3	–	8	–	0
Northwestern	2	–	6	–	0	3	–	8	–	0
Indiana	1	–	7	–	0	1	–	10	–	0
+ – Conference co-champions; Rankings from AP Poll

The 1974 Illinois Fighting Illini football team was an American football team that represented the University of Illinois as a member of the Big Ten Conference during the 1974 Big Ten season. In their fourth year under head coach Bob Blackman, the Fighting Illini compiled a 6–4–1 record (4–3–1 in conference games), finished in fifth place in the Big Ten, and outscored opponents by a total of 210 to 206.

The team's statistical leaders included quarterback Jeff Hollenbach (1,037 passing yards, 48.9% completion percentage), running back Chubby Phillips (772 rushing yards, 4.4 yards per carry, nine touchdowns), and wide receiver Joe Smalzer (29 receptions for 525 yards). Hollenbach and linebacker Tom Hicks were selected as the team's most valuable players. Hicks also received first-team honors on the 1974 All-Big Ten Conference football team.

The team played its home games at Memorial Stadium in Champaign, Illinois.

== Schedule ==
Date	Opponent	Rank	Site	Result	Attendance	Source
September 14	Indiana		Memorial Stadium; Champaign, IL (rivalry)	W 16–0	40,911	
September 21	at No. 19 Stanford*		Stanford Stadium; Stanford, CA	W 41–7	47,500	
September 28	Washington State*	No. 16	Memorial Stadium; Champaign, IL	W 21–19	40,594	
October 5	California*	No. 14	Memorial Stadium; Champaign, IL	L 14–31	54,378	
October 12	at Purdue		Ross–Ade Stadium; West Lafayette, IN (rivalry)	W 27–23	63,174	
October 19	Michigan State		Memorial Stadium; Champaign, IL	T 21–21	55,677	
October 26	at Iowa		Kinnick Stadium; Iowa City, IA	L 12–14	49,400	
November 2	at No. 1 Ohio State		Ohio Stadium; Columbus, OH (Illibuck)	L 7–49	87,813	
November 9	No. 4 Michigan		Memorial Stadium; Champaign, IL (rivalry)	L 6–14	60,670	
November 16	at Minnesota		Memorial Stadium; Minneapolis, MN	W 17–14	31,423	
November 23	Northwestern		Memorial Stadium; Champaign, IL (rivalry)	W 28–14	33,753	
*Non-conference game; Rankings from AP Poll released prior to the game
