= 1974 Ohio State Buckeyes football team =

American college football season

1974 Ohio State Buckeyes football
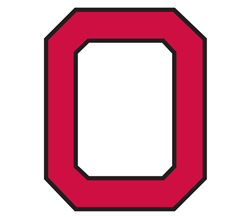

Big Ten co-champion

Rose Bowl, L 17–18 vs. USC
- Conference: Big Ten Conference

Ranking
- Coaches: No. 3
- AP: No. 4
- Record: 10–2 (7–1 Big Ten)
- Head coach: Woody Hayes (24th season)
- Defensive coordinator: George Hill (4th season)
- MVP: Archie Griffin
- Captains: Neal Colzie; Pete Cusick; Archie Griffin; Arnold Jones; Steve Myers
- Home stadium: Ohio Stadium

1974 Big Ten Conference football standings
	Conf.					Overall
Team	W		L		T	W		L		T
No. 3 Michigan +	7	–	1	–	0	10	–	1	–	0
No. 4 Ohio State +	7	–	1	–	0	10	–	2	–	0
No. 12 Michigan State	6	–	1	–	1	7	–	3	–	1
Wisconsin	5	–	3	–	0	7	–	4	–	0
Illinois	4	–	3	–	1	6	–	4	–	1
Purdue	3	–	5	–	0	4	–	6	–	1
Minnesota	2	–	6	–	0	4	–	7	–	0
Iowa	2	–	6	–	0	3	–	8	–	0
Northwestern	2	–	6	–	0	3	–	8	–	0
Indiana	1	–	7	–	0	1	–	10	–	0
+ – Conference co-champions; Rankings from AP Poll

The 1974 Ohio State Buckeyes football team was an American football team that represented the Ohio State University in the 1974 Big Ten Conference football season. The Buckeyes compiled a 10–2 record, including the 1975 Rose Bowl in Pasadena, California, where they lost, 18–17, to the USC Trojans.

1974 was the first season in which Ohio State played an 11-game regular season schedule. The National Collegiate Athletic Association (NCAA) allowed teams to schedule 11 regular season games beginning in 1970, but the Buckeyes played only nine regular season games in 1970, their last nine-game regular season. Ohio State played 10 regular season games in 1971, '72 and '73.

== Schedule ==
Date	Time	Opponent	Rank	Site	TV	Result	Attendance	Source
September 14	2:30 p.m.	at Minnesota	No. 4	Memorial Stadium; Minneapolis, MN		W 34–19	45,511	
September 21	1:30 p.m.	Oregon State*	No. 2	Ohio Stadium; Columbus, OH		W 51–10	86,383	
September 28	1:30 p.m.	SMU*	No. 1	Ohio Stadium; Columbus, OH		W 28–9	87,487	
October 5	4:30 p.m.	vs. Washington State*	No. 1	Husky Stadium; Seattle, WA		W 42–7	50,000	
October 12	1:30 p.m.	Wisconsin	No. 1	Ohio Stadium; Columbus, OH		W 52–7	87,717	
October 19	1:30 p.m.	Indiana	No. 1	Ohio Stadium; Columbus, OH		W 49–9	87,671	
October 26	2:30 p.m.	at Northwestern	No. 1	Dyche Stadium; Evanston, IL		W 55–7	42,337	
November 2	1:30 p.m.	Illinois^{†}	No. 1	Ohio Stadium; Columbus, OH (Illibuck)		W 49–7	87,813	
November 9	12:30 p.m.	at Michigan State	No. 1	Spartan Stadium; East Lansing, MI	ABC	L 13–16	78,533	
November 16	2:30 p.m.	at Iowa	No. 4	Kinnick Stadium; Iowa City, IA		W 35–10	48,700	
November 23	1:00 p.m.	No. 2 Michigan	No. 3	Ohio Stadium; Columbus, OH (rivalry)	ABC	W 12–10	88,243	
January 1, 1975	5:00 p.m.	vs. No. 5 USC*	No. 3	Rose Bowl; Pasadena, CA (Rose Bowl)	NBC	L 17–18	106,721	
*Non-conference game; ^{†}Homecoming; Rankings from AP Poll released prior to the game; All times are in Eastern time

== Game summaries ==
=== At Minnesota ===
#4 Ohio State Buckeyes (0–0) at Minnesota Golden Gophers (0–0)

Quarter	1	2	3	4	Total
Ohio St	7	14	7	6	34
Minnesota	3	0	0	16	19

at Memorial Stadium, Minneapolis, Minnesota

- Date: September 14, 1974
- Game weather: Sunny • 69 °F (21 °C) • Wind 18 miles per hour (29 km/h; 16 kn)
- Game attendance: 45,511

Game information

First quarter

- OSU – Archie Griffin 10-yard run (Tom Skladany kick), 9:31. Ohio St 7–0. Drive: 11 plays, 77 yards.
- MINN – Steve Goldberg 52-yard field goal, 1:56. Ohio St 7–3. Drive:

Second quarter

- OSU – Pete Johnson 4-yard run (Tom Skladany kick), 12:59. Ohio St 14–3. Drive: 9 plays, 73 yards.
- OSU – Champ Henson 36-yard run (Tom Skladany kick), 9:25. Ohio St 21–3. Drive: 4 plays, 59 yards.

Third quarter

- OSU – Cornelius Greene 1-yard run (Tom Skladany kick), 11:26. Ohio St 28–3. Drive: 6 plays, 38 yards.

Fourth quarter 3

- MINN – Rick Upchurch 36-yard run (pass good), 9:29. Ohio St 28–11. Drive: 3 plays, 65 yards.
- MINN – Tony Dungy 6-yard run (pass good), 5:14. Ohio St 28–19. Drive: 5 plays, 16 yards.
- OSU – Cornelius Greene 57-yard run (kick failed), 1:17. Ohio St 34–19. Drive: 9 plays, 86 yards.

Top passers

- OSU – Cornelius Greene – 9/12, 136 yards
- MINN – Tony Dungy – 5/19, 71 yards, INT

Top rushers

- OSU – Archie Griffin – 26 rushes, 133 yards, TD
- MINN – Rick Upchurch – 13 rushes, 107 yards, TD

Top receivers

- OSU – Dave Hazel – 3 receptions, 63 yards
- MINN – Rick Upchurch – 3 receptions, 50 yards

Archie Griffin sets school career rushing record

=== Michigan State ===
Ohio State fans still insist that Brian Baschnagel scored from one yard out on the final play at Michigan State on November 9. The game officials ruled otherwise, and the Buckeyes suffered a 16-13 loss that cost them the no.1 ranking. Ohio State entered the game at 8-0 and the Spartans were 4-3-1. The frantic, final play occurred after Champ Henson was stopped within inches of the goal line with 13 seconds remaining. Ohio State was out of timeouts, and Michigan State's players were slow getting off the pile. The Buckeyes scrambled and snapped the ball, but it went through QB Cornelius Greene's legs. Baschnagel picked it up and ran into the end zone. Head linesman Ed Scheck signaled touchdown, but field judge Robert Dagenhardt ruled that time had run out before the play began. Fans of each school climbed atop the goalposts, uncertain which team had won. 46 minutes later, with about 40,000 of the 78,533 fans still in the stadium, the public address announcer told the half-empty stadium that Big Ten commissioner Wayne Duke had decided the officials were correct in ruling that time has expired. Referee Gene Calhoun also said the Buckeyes would have been penalized if time had not run out because they didn't come to a one-second set before the snap of the ball.

== Personnel ==
=== Coaching staff ===
- Woody Hayes – head coach (24th year)
- George Chaump – offensive coordinator (7th year)
- George Hill – defensive coordinator (4th year)
- Joe Bugel – offensive guards (1st year)
- Charles Clausen – defensive line (4th year)
- Mickey Jackson – (1st year)
- John Mummey – quarterbacks (6th year)
- Ralph Staub – tackles, tight ends (5th year)
- Dick Walker – defensive backs (6th year)
- Blair Conway – place kicker, punter (1st year)
- Jeff Kaplan - director of counseling, 'brain coach' (2nd year)

=== Roster ===
1974 Ohio State Buckeyes football team roster
Players
Coaches
Offense

Pos.	#	Name	Class
TE		Mike Bartoszek
WR	48	Brian Baschnagel	Jr
OL		Scott Dannelley
TE		Doug France
QB		Cornelius Greene	Jr
RB		Archie Griffin (C)	Jr
RB		Ray Griffin
WR		Dave Hazel
FB		Champ Henson
WR		Tim Holycross
TE		Bob Hyatt
FB		Pete Johnson
TE		Larry Kain
TE		Bob Lillie
RB		Jeff Logan
OL		Dick Mack
RB		Dave Mazeroski
QB		Steve Morrison
OL		Steve Myers
QB		Jim Pacenta
OL		Lou Pietrini
QB		Pete Prather
QB		Dave Purdy
RB		Woody Roach
RB		Bob Robertson
QB		Tony Ross
OL		Kurt Schumacher
OL		Ted Smith
RB		Louis Willott
RB		Lenny Willis

Defense

Pos.	#	Name	Class
LB		Brian Bowers
DL		Bob Brudzinski
DL		Nick Buonamici
DB	20	Neal Colzie (C)
DL		Jim Cope
DL		Pete Cusick
DL		Van DeCree
LB		Bruce Elia
DB		Tim Fox
LB		Arnie Jones
LB		Ken Kuhn
DB	46	Steve Luke	Sr
DB		Rich Parsons
DB		Doug Plank
DB		Bruce Ruhl

Special teams

Pos.	#	Name	Class
K, P		Tom Skladany

Head coach

- Woody Hayes

Coordinators/assistant coaches

Legend

- (C) Team captain
- (S) Suspended
- (I) Ineligible
- Injured
- Redshirt

Roster

=== Depth chart ===
Defense

FS
12 Tim Fox
11 Max Midlam
⋅

WLB	MLB	SLB
36 Bruce Elia	42 Arnie Jones	54 Ken Kuhn
⋅	37 Brian Bowers	9 Ed Thompson
⋅	⋅	⋅

SS
24 Rich Parsons
28 Doug Plank
⋅

CB
20 Neal Colzie
29 Jerome Davis
23 Craig Cassady

DE	DT	DT	DE
91 Jim Cope	71 Pete Cusick	75 Nick Buonamici	88 Van DeCree
90 Pat Curto	55 Aaron Brown	67 Eddie Beamon	84 Bob Brudzinski
⋅	⋅	⋅	⋅

CB
46 Steve Luke
43 Bruce Ruhl
⋅

Offense

SE
82 Dave Hazel
8 Bill Ezzo
89 Lenny Willis

LT	LG	C	RG	RT
72 Kurt Schumacher	60 Ted Smith	52 Steve Myers	69 Dick Mack	73 Scott Dannelley
68 Lou Pietrini	64 Bill Lukens	56 Ron Ayers	⋅	78 Garth Cox
⋅	⋅	53 Doug Porter	⋅	⋅

TE
80 Doug France
87 Mike Bartoszek
⋅

WB
48 Brian Baschnagel
27 Tim Holycross
35 Bob Hyatt

QB
7 Cornelius Greene
17 Steve Morrison
19 Dave Purdy

FB
38 Champ Henson
33 Pete Johnson
⋅

Special teams
PK 6 Tom Klaban
PK 5 Tom McBrayer
P 1 Tom Skladany
P 3 Mike Keeton
KR 89 Lenny Willis
PR 20 Neal Colzie

RB
45 Archie Griffin
44 Ray Griffin
41 Woody Roach

== Awards and honors ==
- Archie Griffin, Heisman Trophy

== 1975 NFL draftees ==
Player	Round	Pick	Position	NFL club
Kurt Schumacher	1	12	Guard	New Orleans Saints
Doug France	1	20	Tackle	Los Angeles Rams
Neal Colzie	1	24	Defensive back	Oakland Raiders
Peter Cusick	3	66	Nose tackle	New England Patriots
Steve Luke	4	88	Defensive back	Green Bay Packers
Champ Henson	4	89	Running back	Minnesota Vikings
Bruce Elia	4	100	Linebacker	Miami Dolphins
Jim Cope	5	119	Linebacker	Cleveland Browns
Dave Hazel	11	261	Wide receiver	Baltimore Colts
Steve Myers	11	275	Guard	Detroit Lions
Doug Plank	12	291	Defensive back	Chicago Bears
Larry O'Rourke	14	354	Defensive tackle	Philadelphia Eagles
Mike Bartoszek	17	430	Tight end	New York Jets
