= Pete Cusick =

American football player (born 1952)

No. 76
- Position: Nose tackle

Personal information
- Born: October 27, 1952 (age 74); San Bernardino, California, U.S.
- Listed height: 6 ft 1 in (1.85 m)
- Listed weight: 255 lb (116 kg)

Career information
- High school: Lakewood (Lakewood, Ohio)
- College: Ohio State
- NFL draft: 1975: 3rd round, 66th overall pick

Career history
- New England Patriots (1975–1978)

Awards and highlights
- First-team All-American (1974); 2× First-team All-Big Ten (1973, 1974)
- Stats at Pro Football Reference

Peter Martin Cusick (born October 27, 1952) is an American former professional football nose tackle who played for the New England Patriots of the National Football League (NFL). He played college football for the Ohio State Buckeyes and was selected by the Patriots in the third round of the 1975 NFL draft.

== Early life ==
Peter Martin Cusick was born on October 27, 1952, in San Bernardino, California. He played high school football at Lakewood High School in Lakewood, Ohio as a fullback/linebacker.

== College career ==
Cusick enrolled at Ohio State University to play college football for the Buckeyes. He was on the freshman team in 1971 and was a three-year starter at defensive tackle from 1972 to 1974. He earned first-team All-Big Ten Conference honors in 1973 and 1974. As a senior defensive team captain in 1974, he was named a first-team All-American by the The Sporting News, a second-team All-American by the United Press, and a third-team All-American by the Associated Press. In 1974, Cusick was reported as being the strongest player on the team and could bench press 500 pounds. He finished his college career with 242 tackles. Ohio State had a 29–4–1 record during Cusick's three seasons as a starter. In 2000, the Touchdown Club of Columbus named him to the Ohio State Football All-Century Team. He was inducted into the Ohio State Varsity O Hall of Fame in 2012.

== Professional career ==
Cusick was selected by the Patriots in the third round, with the 66th overall pick, of the 1975 NFL draft. He signed with the team on July 21. He played in 13 games for the Patriots during the 1975 season as a reserve nose tackle and posted one sack. Cusick missed three straight seasons due to injury from 1976 to 1978. He became a free agent after the 1978 season and was not re-signed.
