= Steve Strinko =

American football player (born 1952)

Profile
- Position: Linebacker

Personal information
- Born: October 5, 1952; Middletown, Ohio, U.S.
- Died: August 14, 2023 (aged 70); Dallas, Texas, U.S.

Career information
- College: Michigan
- NFL draft: 1975: 9th round, 219 (By the Detroit Lions)th overall pick

Career history
- 1972–1974: Michigan

Awards and highlights
- Second-team All-American (1974); First-team All-Big Ten (1974); Second-team All-Big Ten (1973)

Steven Douglas Strinko (October 5, 1952 — August 14, 2023) was an American football player. He played as a linebacker for Coach Bo Schembechler at the University of Michigan and was selected as the Most Valuable Player on the 1974 Michigan Wolverines football team. He subsequently founded FAN, Inc., a non-profit organization established to identify and provide medical assistance to former NCAA athletes experiencing hardships as a result of injuries incurred during sanctioned NCAA activities.

== Monroe High School ==
Strinko was born in Middletown, Ohio, the son of Thomas and Earlene Strinko. He attended Monroe High School in Monroe, Ohio, and earned three letters each in track and football and one in basketball. He was a linebacker and offensive tackle on the Monroe Hornets football team from 1968 to 1970. In Strinko's three seasons of varsity football at Monroe, the team lost only one football game. Strinko was selected for the All Mid Miami Conference three times, All Southwestern Ohio two times, All-Ohio two times, and was selected as a first-team Scholastic Coach Magazine High School All-American. In May 1971, he also received the Banquet of Champions award as the outstanding male high school athlete in the Greater Cincinnati area. In January 2010, Strinko was named as an honorable mention selection on the All-Time All-Ohio High School Football Team.

Strinko also maintained a 4.0 grade point average as a high school student, and was the sports editor on the school paper and a member of the student council and National Honor Society.

== University of Michigan ==
=== Commitment to Michigan ===
As one of Ohio's top football recruits in the Class of 1971, Strinko was recruited by Alabama, Ohio State, Notre Dame, Stanford, Michigan and other universities. In January 1971, Strinko and his parents watched Super Bowl V with Ohio State Coach Woody Hayes at his house. The Strinkos were the only family invited and enjoyed a home-cooked meal prepared by Hayes' wife Anne. In March 1971, Strinko announced that he had accepted a scholarship to attend the University of Michigan. At the time of his commitment to Michigan, one Ohio newspaper reported:

"Herculean Steve Strinko, one of the most complete gridiron players in Southwestern Ohio, signed a letter of intent to the University of Michigan, Ann Arbor, Wednesday evening at his residence in the suburbs of Monroe. ... Strinko, who possesses superbrains and super-brawn to complement a super-personality, was all smiles as he inked his promise to attend the conference football powerhouse."

Strinko dismissed the notion that he was a "traitor" for choosing Michigan over Ohio State, noting that he chose Michigan "because I liked Bo [Michigan head football coach Bo Schembechler] a lot. I was probably more impressed with him than with OSU Coach Woody Hayes. They (Michigan recruiters) said I'd definitely play linebacker here. That's what I've always wanted to play. Other schools said I might play somewhere else." Strinko later recalled that Woody Hayes never got over his decision to attend Michigan.

=== 1973 season ===
Strinko started all 11 games at middle linebacker for the undefeated 1973 Michigan Wolverines football team and set a University of Michigan record with 137 tackles during the 1973 season. The 1973 team won the first 10 games of the season but played Ohio State to a 10-10 tie in the final game of the season. The defense allowed only 68 points, an average of 6.2 points per game. The Big Ten Conference voted to send Ohio State to the Rose Bowl, and conference rules prevented a second Big Ten team from accepting a bowl bid. Before the 1974 rematch with Ohio State, Strinko said, "You're never going to see a team as high as Michigan in Columbus. It went to a vote last year and they shafted us. So we're not going to let them shaft us this time. The other day some of us were sitting around watching TV and one of the guys said, 'If you gave me an elbow pad before the Ohio State game I'd be ready to eat it.'"

=== 1974 season ===
As a senior, Strinko started 10 games at middle linebacker for the 1974 team, missing one game due to a knee injury suffered in the fourth game of the season against Stanford. Strinko also called the signals on defense for the 1974 team that allowed only 75 points, an average of 6.8 points per game. In October 1974, Michigan defensive coordinator Gary Moeller called Strinko "the best linebacker we've had at Michigan. He hustles all over the field. I can see why the pro scouts are so high on him." Strinko accumulated 117 tackles in 10 games and was selected by his teammates as the Most Valuable Player on the 1974 team. Years later, Strinko said, "Of all my accomplishments I consider [the 1974 Most Valuable Player award] the most important. I am humbled to this day at being its recipient and at times fear I have not lived up to its relevance. The Most Valuable Player Award, since it is voted on by your peers, is, at its essence, a reflection of leadership and dedication to 'TEAM'."

At the end of the 1974 season, Strinko was selected by the United Press International as a first-team All-Big Ten player and a second-team All-American player.

Strinko's younger brother, Greg Strinko, also played for the 1974 Michigan team as a defensive end.

Strinko later said that, outside of his family relationships, playing football at Michigan for Bo Schembechler was "the single most rewarding experience of my life. The camaraderie and meaningful friendships formed in those four years are enduring and special."

== Detroit Lions ==
Strinko was selected by the Detroit Lions in the ninth round (219th overall pick) of the 1975 NFL draft. When Strinko was not drafted after the first six rounds, Michigan coach Bo Schembechler told reporters he was shocked: "Strinko hasn't been drafted yet? That is unbelievable! Astounding!" He underwent knee surgery before signing with the Lions in June 1975. Strinko's knee did not recuperate fully following the surgery, and he was placed on the injured reserve list for the entire 1975 season. Strinko later recalled:

"I had spent my rookie year, 1975, on injured reserve recovering from knee surgery performed by the University of Michigan's Orthopedic Specialist, Dr. O'Connor. You see the Lions would not sign me to a contract unless Michigan's Team Doctor's performed the necessary surgery, as the injury had occurred playing football at Michigan. This process relieved the Lions from any liability."

Strinko attempted to make the Lions team in 1976, but he was unable to keep fluid off of his knee, and the Lions told him that his condition was chronic and degenerative. In the end, Strinko never played in an NFL game.

== FAN, Inc. ==
In 2007, Strinko was awaiting knee replacement surgery and a determination by the Social Security Administration regarding his application for disability. He had no insurance and there was no organization in place that offered financial assistance to athletes injured while participating in college athletics. Strinko organized a non-profit organization called FAN, Inc., the Foundation for Athletes in Need. The mission of FAN, Inc., is to identify and provide medical assistance to former NCAA athletes experiencing hardships as a result of injuries incurred during sanctioned NCAA activities. Strinko states that he has been certified as 100% disabled, qualifying him for Medicare benefits, so that the funds raised by FAN, Inc., would not be used for his own medical needs. He noted that his goal is to assist others who are not fortunate to have the means to fund their medical care. On the FAN, Inc. web site, Strinko states:

"Over the course of time I have discovered what I believe is a serious gap in services for former student athletes who have been injured while participating in an NCAA sanctioned sport. These athletes have dedicated, not only their hearts and minds but also their bodies to the success and proliferation of their respective university athletic programs. Many of these injuries have manifested into long-term, chronic problems. These debilitating injuries are often left untreated which only exacerbates the problem. My goal in the creation of FAN, Inc. ... is to assist these under and uninsured individuals in obtaining relevant, professional services."
