= Muskegon Heights High School =

Muskegon Heights Academy High School

Location
- 2441 Sanford Street; Muskegon Heights, Michigan 49444; United States; 43°12′29″N 86°14′52″W

Information
- School type: Charter school
- School district: Muskegon Heights Public School Academy System
- Principal: Erica Patton
- Teaching staff: 6.80 (FTE)
- Grades: 7–12
- Enrollment: 219 (2023–2024)
- Student to teacher ratio: 32.21
- Campus type: Urban
- Colors: Orange and black
- Nickname: Tigers

Muskegon Heights Academy High School is a public charter high school located in Muskegon Heights, Michigan.

== Overview ==
Muskegon Heights High School is the only high school in the Muskegon Heights Public School Academy System (MHPSAS). The high school is known for its strong tradition in both athletics and the band program.

In February 2013, Mosaica was investigated for the illegal employment of uncertified teachers in its schools in Muskegon Heights. MHPSAS went on to become its own public charter school district.

== Name change and transition ==
Following a transition, Muskegon Heights Public High School was changed to Muskegon Heights Academy High School, a charter school at the start of the 2012–2013 school year. It has since changed to Muskegon Heights Academy as of July 2014.

== Demographics ==
Muskegon Heights High School is 95.6% Black, 1.4% White, 0.7% Asian, and 1.6% Hispanic. With a gender breakdown of 48.4% of females and 50.9% of males at this school.

== Shooting ==
In 2016, three students were shot and wounded on school grounds during a late-night football game, and the suspect was shot and wounded by police gunfire. The officer would later be cleared of wrongdoing.

== Championships ==
Football 1945, 1946, 1947 1957

Basketball 1954, 1956, 1957, 1974, 1978, 1979
