= Earl Douthitt =

American football player (1952–2013)

No. 43
- Position: Defensive back

Personal information
- Born: September 8, 1952; Cleveland, Ohio, U.S.
- Died: October 29, 2013 (aged 61); Youngstown, Ohio, U.S.
- Listed height: 6 ft 2 in (1.88 m)
- Listed weight: 188 lb (85 kg)

Career information
- High school: Cleveland (OH) John Hay
- College: Iowa
- NFL draft: 1975: 7th round, 178th overall pick

Career history
- Chicago Bears (1975)

Awards and highlights
- First-team All-Big Ten (1974); Second-team All-Big Ten (1973)
- Stats at Pro Football Reference

Earl Douthitt (September 8, 1952 – October 29, 2013) was an American professional football defensive back. He played for the Chicago Bears in 1975.

He died after being hit by a motorist on October 29, 2013, in Youngstown, Ohio at age 61.
