= Denny Stolz =

American football coach (1933–2023)

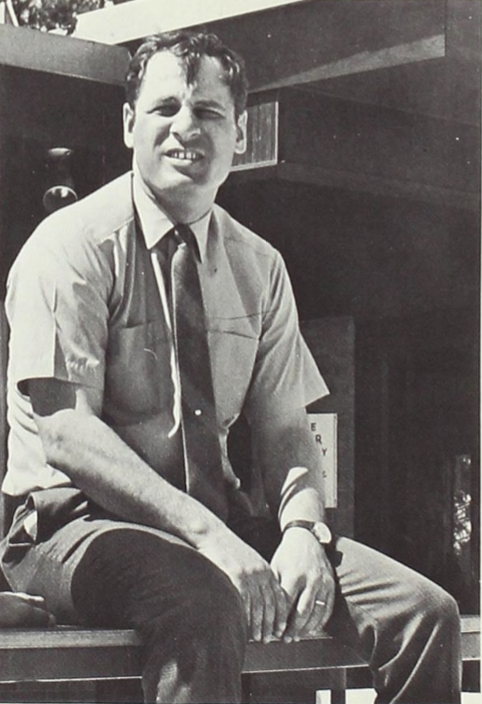
- Stolz, c. 1970

Biographical details
- Born: September 12, 1933; Lansing, Michigan, U.S.
- Died: May 25, 2023 (aged 89); Midland, Michigan, U.S.

Playing career
- 1954: Alma

Coaching career (HC unless noted)
- 1955–1962: Haslett HS (MI)
- 1963–1964: Eastern HS (MI)
- 1965–1970: Alma
- 1971–1972: Michigan State (DC)
- 1973–1975: Michigan State
- 1977–1985: Bowling Green
- 1986–1988: San Diego State

Head coaching record
- Overall: 125–93–2 (college)
- Bowls: 0–3

Accomplishments and honors

Championships
- 3 MIAA (1967–1968, 1970); 2 MAC (1982, 1985); 1 WAC (1986)

Awards
- MIAA Coach of the Year (1967); Big Ten Coach of the Year (1974); 2× MAC Coach of the Year (1982, 1985); WAC Coach of the Year (1986)

Dennis Earl Stolz (September 12, 1933 – May 25, 2023) was an American college football coach. He served as the head coach at Alma College (1965–1970), Michigan State University (1973–1975), Bowling Green State University (1977–1985), and San Diego State University (1986–1988), compiling a career college record of 126–92–2. He earned conference coach of the year honors while at each school.

Stolz played both football and baseball while attending Alma College. He coached at the high school level before returning to his alma mater and starting his college coaching career.

== Early life and education ==
Stolz was born in Lansing, Michigan, on September 12, 1933. He attended Mason High School, where he earned 10 varsity letters: four in baseball and three apiece in football and basketball. At Alma College, Stolz was a four-year letterman in both football and baseball. In football, he earned second-team all-conference honors playing quarterback in the Michigan Intercollegiate Athletic Association (MIAA) in 1954. He graduated in 1955.

== Coaching career ==
Stolz began coaching at Haslett High School in 1955, compiling a 40–13–3 record in eight seasons. After a short term at Eastern High School, he returned to Alma College, where the football team had not had a winning season in a decade. Stolz turned the Alma program around in two seasons, leading them to an 8–0 season in 1967, when he was named the MIAA coach of the year. They were 8–0 again in 1968, and won three MIAA championships in 1967, 1968 and 1970. He was 34–16 in six seasons at Alma.

Stolz joined the Michigan State Spartans in 1971, serving as defensive coordinator and linebacker coach for two seasons before being promoted to succeed Duffy Daugherty as head coach on December 12, 1972. He was selected over Johnny Majors, Lee Corso and Barry Switzer, who had removed himself from consideration the previous day. In 1974, he led the Spartans to a 7–3–1 record, winning their last five games. They came within a tie game of sharing the Big Ten Conference title with Ohio State and Michigan, and Stolz was named the Big Ten Coach of the Year. His three years as Spartans head coach was marred by a player recruiting scandal that culminated with the National Collegiate Athletic Association (NCAA) placing the program on three years' probation on January 25, 1976. As a result, the Spartans were prohibited from any television and bowl game appearances through the 1978 season. Stolz resigned at the behest of university president Clifton R. Wharton Jr. and the board of trustees just over seven weeks later on March 16, 1976. He left Michigan State with a 19–13–1 record in three seasons.

After a year away from coaching, Stolz coached the Bowling Green Falcons for nine seasons. He began with five non-winning seasons. Stolz then led Bowling Green to four straight winning seasons with Brian McClure, who became the second quarterback in major college history to throw for more than 10,000 yards in their career. The Falcons won Mid-American Conference (MAC) championships in 1982 and 1985, and Stolz was named the MAC Coach of the Year in both years. In his final season at Bowling Green in 1985, he accepted the head coach position with the San Diego State Aztecs three days before the Falcons played in the 1985 California Bowl, which they lost 51–7 to Fresno State. Stolz was 56–45–1 at Bowling Green, including 34–12 in his last four seasons.

At San Diego State University, Stolz inherited a program that had three consecutive losing seasons and was coming off its second-worst home attendance in its then-19 years at San Diego Stadium, barely reaching 10,000 fans in each of its final two home games of 1985. In his first season in 1986, he led the Aztecs to their only Western Athletic Conference (WAC) title and appearance in San Diego's Holiday Bowl. In a nationally televised game, San Diego State clinched the conference title by defeating BYU for the first time since 1970, and earned their first bowl game since the Pasadena Bowl in 1969. Stolz was voted the WAC Coach of the Year, and the school rewarded him by extending his contract an extra year to 1991. He was fired two years later, when the Aztecs finished 3–8 in 1988. He was 16–19 in three seasons at San Diego State.

== Personal life ==
Stolz and his brother Stan were both inducted into the Mason High School Athletic Hall of Fame, Alma College Athletic Hall of Fame, and Greater Lansing Area Sports Hall of Fame.

Stolz was married to his wife, Cena, for 60 years, until her death in 2016. He died at home in Midland, Michigan, on May 25, 2023, at age 89.

== Head coaching record ==
Year	Team	Overall	Conference	Standing	Bowl/playoffs	Coaches^{#}	AP^{°}
Alma Scots (Michigan Intercollegiate Athletic Association) (1965–1970)
1965	Alma	3–5	1–4	T–5th			
1966	Alma	5–4 (Note: A 21–20 loss to Bluffton was forfeited to Alma.)	3–2	T–2nd			
1967	Alma	8–0	5–0	1st			
1968	Alma	8–0	5–0	1st			
1969	Alma	6–3	4–1	2nd			
1970	Alma	5–3	4–1	T–1st			
Alma:		35–15	22–8				
Michigan State Spartans (Big Ten Conference) (1973–1975)
1973	Michigan State	5–6	4–4	T–4th			
1974	Michigan State	7–3–1	6–1–1	3rd		18	12
1975	Michigan State	7–4	4–4	T–3rd			
Michigan State:		19–13–1	14–9–1				
Bowling Green Falcons (Mid-American Conference) (1977–1985)
1977	Bowling Green	5–7	4–3	T–5th			
1978	Bowling Green	4–7	3–5	T–5th			
1979	Bowling Green	4–7	3–5	8th			
1980	Bowling Green	4–7	4–4	7th			
1981	Bowling Green	5–5–1	5–3–1	4th			
1982	Bowling Green	7–5	7–2	1st	L California		
1983	Bowling Green	8–3	7–2	T–2nd			
1984	Bowling Green	8–3	7–2	2nd			
1985	Bowling Green	11–1	9–0	1st	L California		
Bowling Green:		56–45–1	49–26–1				
San Diego State Aztecs (Western Athletic Conference) (1986–1988)
1986	San Diego State	8–4	7–1	1st	L Holiday		
1987	San Diego State	5–7	4–4	5th			
1988	San Diego State	3–8	3–5	T–6th			
San Diego State:		16–19	14–10				
Total:		126–92–2					
National championship Conference title Conference division title or championship game berth
^{#}Rankings from final Coaches Poll.; ^{°}Rankings from final AP Poll.
