= Dan Jilek =

American football player (1953–2002)

No. 51
- Position: Linebacker

Personal information
- Born: December 3, 1953; Cedar Rapids, Iowa, U.S.
- Died: March 6, 2002 (aged 48); Ann Arbor, Michigan, U.S.
- Listed height: 6 ft 2 in (1.88 m)
- Listed weight: 220 lb (100 kg)

Career information
- High school: Stevenson
- College: Michigan
- NFL draft: 1976: 4th round, 109th overall pick

Career history
- Buffalo Bills (1976–1979)

Awards and highlights
- 2× First-team All-Big Ten (1974, 1975)

Career NFL statistics
- Sacks: 2
- Fumble recoveries: 5
- Interceptions: 2
- Stats at Pro Football Reference

Daniel Douglas Jilek (December 3, 1953 – March 6, 2002) was an American football linebacker and defensive end. He played college football for the Michigan Wolverines (1973–1975) and professional football for the Buffalo Bills (1976–1979).

== Early life ==
Jilek was born in Cedar Rapids, Iowa, in 1953. He attended Stevenson High School in Sterling Heights, Michigan, where he played football, baseball, and basketball. In football, he played at the halfback and linebacker positions and led the team in both touchdowns and tackles. Jilek was posthumously inducted into Adlai E. Stevenson High School's athletic hall of fame as part of the inaugural class in 2023.

== University of Michigan ==
Jilek enrolled at the University of Michigan in 1972 and played college football at the defensive end position for Bo Schembechler's Michigan Wolverines football teams in 1973, 1974, and 1975. During Jilek's three seasons with the team, the Wolverines compiled a 28–3–3 record and gave up an average of only 8.0 points per game. As a senior, Jilek was selected as a first-team defensive end on the 1975 All-Big Ten Conference football team, and a first-team Academic All-American.

== Buffalo Bills ==
Jilek was selected by the Buffalo Bills in the fourth round (109th overall pick) of the 1976 NFL draft. As a rookie in 1976, he started 14 games for the Bills, intercepted two passes, recovered three fumbles and was the Bills' rookie of the year. He played for the Bills as a linebacker from 1976 to 1979, appearing in 58 games, 29 of them as a starter.

== Later life ==
After retiring from football, Jilek operated an insurance company. He died in 2002 at age 48 in Ann Arbor, Michigan.

A 5k fun run is held each fall to honor Dan Jilek's memory and to support his commitment to improve youth via athletics.
