= 1972 Big Ten Conference football season =

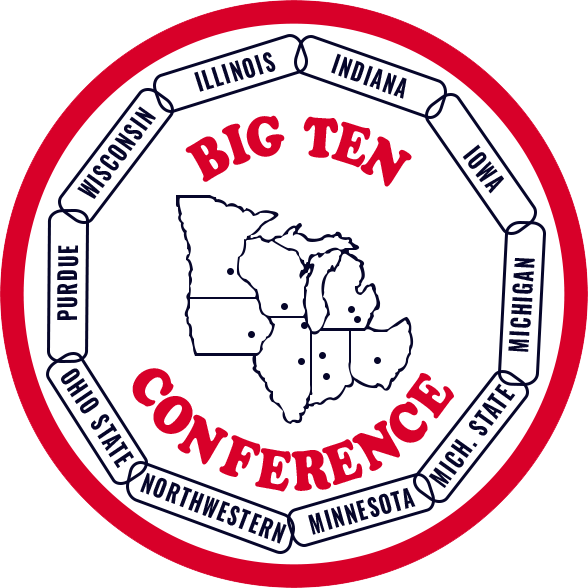
- Sport: American football
- Teams: 10
- Top draft pick: Dave Butz
- Co-champions: Michigan, Ohio State
- Runners-up: Purdue
- Season MVP: Otis Armstrong

Seasons
- 1971 1973

1972 Big Ten Conference football standings
	Conf.					Overall
Team	W		L		T	W		L		T
No. 6 Michigan +	7	–	1	–	0	10	–	1	–	0
No. 9 Ohio State +	7	–	1	–	0	9	–	2	–	0
Purdue	6	–	2	–	0	6	–	5	–	0
Michigan State	5	–	2	–	1	5	–	5	–	1
Minnesota	4	–	4	–	0	4	–	7	–	0
Indiana	3	–	5	–	0	5	–	6	–	0
Illinois	3	–	5	–	0	3	–	8	–	0
Iowa	2	–	6	–	1	3	–	7	–	1
Wisconsin	2	–	6	–	0	4	–	7	–	0
Northwestern	1	–	8	–	0	2	–	9	–	0
+ – Conference co-champions; Rankings from AP Poll

The 1972 Big Ten Conference football season was the 77th season of college football played by the member schools of the Big Ten Conference and was a part of the 1972 NCAA University Division football season.

The 1972 Michigan Wolverines football team, under coach Bo Schembechler, compiled a 10–1 record, tied for the Big Ten championship, led the conference in scoring defense (5.2 points allowed per game), and was ranked No. 6 in the final AP and Coaches Polls. Michigan won its first ten games with four conference shutouts, and was ranked No. 3 in the AP Poll prior to its 14–11 road loss to Ohio State. Defensive back Randy Logan and offensive tackle Paul Seymour were consensus first-team All-Americans. Schembecher won the first Big Ten Football Coach of the Year award.

The 1972 Ohio State Buckeyes football team, under head coach Woody Hayes, compiled a 9–2 record, tied with Michigan for the Big Ten championship, led the conference in scoring offense (25.5 points per game), and was ranked No. 9 in the final AP Poll. The Buckeyes received the conference's berth in the 1973 Rose Bowl and lost to national champion USC, 42–17. Linebacker Randy Gradishar was a consensus first-team All-American.

Purdue running back Otis Armstrong led the Big Ten with 1,361 rushing yards, received the Chicago Tribune Silver Football as the conference's most valuable player, and was a consensus first-team All-American.

== Season overview ==
=== Results and team statistics ===
Conf. Rank	Team	Head coach	AP final	AP high	Overall record	Conf. record	PPG	PAG	MVP
1 (tie)	Michigan	Bo Schembechler	#6	#3	10–1	7–1	24.0	**5.2**	Randy Logan
1 (tie)	Ohio State	Woody Hayes	#9	#3	9–2	7–1	**25.5**	15.5	George Hasenohrl
3	Purdue	Bob DeMoss	NR	#18	6–5	6–2	22.3	12.3	**Otis Armstrong**
4	Michigan State	Duffy Daugherty	NR	#18	5–5–1	5–2–1	14.4	14.2	Gail Clark
5	Minnesota	Cal Stoll	NR	NR	4–7	4–4	16.8	27.6	John King
6 (tie)	Indiana	John Pont	NR	NR	5–6	3–5	18.5	24.7	Glenn Scolnik
6 (tie)	Illinois	Bob Blackman	NR	NR	3–8	3–5	17.9	25.2	Larry McCarren; Larry Allen
8	Iowa	Frank Lauterbur	NR	NR	3–7–1	2–6–1	9.9	18.9	Dan Dickel
9	Wisconsin	John Jardine	NR	NR	4–7	2–6	13.8	20.8	Rufus Ferguson
10	Northwestern	Alex Agase	NR	NR	2–9	1–8	13.3	26.4	Jim Lash; Jim Anderson

Key
AP final = Team's rank in the final AP Poll of the 1972 season
AP high = Team's highest rank in the AP Poll throughout the 1972 season
PPG = Average of points scored per game; conference leader's average displayed in bold
PAG = Average of points allowed per game; conference leader's average displayed in bold
MVP = Most valuable player as voted by players on each team as part of the voting process to determine the winner of the Chicago Tribune Silver Football trophy; trophy winner in bold

=== Regular season ===
==== September 16 ====
On September 16, 1972, the Big Ten football teams played four conference games and two non-conference teams. The non-conference games resulted in one win and one loss.

- Michigan 7, Northwestern 0. Michigan defeated Northwestern, 7–0, before a crowd of 71,757 at Michigan Stadium. Dennis Franklin threw a 21-yard touchdown pass to Bo Rather. The touchdown was set up by an interception by Michigan linebacker Craig Mutch which he returned 18 yards to Northwestern's 31-yard line. Northwestern's Jim Trimble rushed for 103 yards on 20 carries. Dennis Franklin, starting his first game, became the first African-American quarterback to play for Michigan.
- Ohio State 21, Iowa 0
- Indiana 27, Minnesota 23
- Michigan State 24, Illinois 0
- Bowling Green 17, Purdue 14
- Wisconsin 31, Northern Illinois 7

==== September 23 ====
On September 23, 1972, the Big Ten football teams played nine non-conference games, resulting in three wins and six losses. Ohio State had a bye week.

- Michigan 26, UCLA 9. Michigan (ranked No. 11 in the AP Poll) defeated UCLA (ranked No. 6), 26–9, in front of a crowd of 57,129 at the Los Angeles Memorial Coliseum. UCLA was led by quarterback Mark Harmon, a junior college transfer and the son of Michigan legend Tom Harmon, and had opened the season two weeks earlier with an upset of No. 1 Nebraska, halting the Huskers' unbeaten streak at 32 games. Michigan rushed for 381 yards, including 115 yards and two touchdowns by Ed Shuttlesworth.
- Washington 22, Purdue 21
- Colorado 38, Minnesota 6
- TCU 31, Indiana 28
- Iowa 19, Oregon State 11
- Wisconsin 31, Syracuse 7
- Notre Dame 37, Northwestern 0
- Georgia Tech 21, Michigan State 16
- USC 55, Illinois 20

==== September 30 ====
On September 30, 1972, the Big Ten teams played 10 non-conference games, resulting in four wins and six losses.

- Michigan 41, Tulane 7. Michigan defeated Tulane (ranked No. 18 in the AP Poll), 41–7, in front of a crowd of 84,162 at Michigan Stadium. Michigan rushed for 298 yards, including 151 yards and three touchdowns by Ed Shuttlesworth. In addition, Gil Chapman returned a punt 49 yards and Randy Logan returned an interception 32 yards for touchdowns. On defense, Michigan held Tulane to 56 rushing yards. Tulane did not score until the fourth quarter against Michigan's second- and third-string players.
- Ohio State 29, North Carolina 14
- Notre Dame 35, Purdue 14
- Nebraska 49, Minnesota 0
- Indiana 35, Kentucky 34
- Penn State 14, Iowa 10
- LSU 27, Wisconsin 7. The Badgers' first visit to a Southeastern Conference campus did not go well. The Bayou Bengals limited Rufus "The Roadrunner" Ferguson to 63 yards rushing on 17 carries, and Juan Roca booted an LSU record 52-yard field goal.
- Northwestern 27, Pittsburgh 22
- USC 51, Michigan State 6
- Washington 31, Illinois 11

==== October 7 ====
On October 7, 1972, the Big Ten teams played two conference games and six non-conference games. The non-conference games resulted in three wins and three losses.

- Purdue 24, Iowa 0.
- Wisconsin 21, Northwestern 14.
- Michigan 35, Navy 7. Michigan defeated Navy, 35–7, in front of a crowd of 81,131 at Michigan Stadium. Michigan scored 28 points in the third quarter, including an 83-yard punt return for touchdown by Dave Brown.
- Ohio State 35, California 18
- Kansas 34, Minnesota 28
- Indiana 10, Syracuse 2
- Notre Dame 16, Michigan State 0
- Penn State 35, Illinois 17

==== October 14 ====
On October 14, 1972, the Big Ten teams played five conference games.

- Michigan 10, Michigan State 0. Michigan defeated Michigan State, 10–0, in front of a crowd of 103,735 at Michigan Stadium. The game was Michigan's first shutout victory over Michigan since 1947. Michigan scored on a 22-yard field goal by Mike Lantry in the second quarter and a 58-yard touchdown run by Gil Chapman in the fourth quarter. The Wolverines totaled 334 rushing yards, including 107 by Ed Shuttlesworth. The Spartans had a 24-yard touchdown run called back due to a clipping penalty, and their only other scoring threat ended when a hit from Dave Brown forced the Spartans' ball carrier to fumble into the end zone.
- Ohio State 26, Illinois 7
- Purdue 28, Minnesota 3
- Indiana 33, Wisconsin 7
- Iowa 23, Northwestern 12

==== October 21 ====
On October 21, 1972, the Big Ten teams played five conference games.

- Michigan 31, Illinois 7. Michigan defeated Illinois, 31–7, in front of a crowd of 64,290 for the homecoming game at Memorial Stadium in Champaign, Illinois. The victory was Michigan's sixth in a row against Illinois. Sophomore tailback Chuck Heater led Michigan's rushing attack with 155 yards on 29 carries with touchdown runs in the first and second quarters.
- Ohio State 44, Indiana 7.
- Purdue 37, Northwestern 0.
- Minnesota 43, Iowa 14.
- Michigan State 31, Wisconsin 0.

==== October 28 ====
On October 28, 1972, the Big Ten teams played five conference games.

- Michigan 42, Minnesota 0. Michigan defeated Minnesota, 42–0, in front of a crowd of 84,190 at Michigan Stadium. Michigan's 42 points were its highest total of the season. Fullback Ed Shuttlesworth rushed for 86 yards on 19 carries and scored Michigan's first four touchdowns. Quarterback Dennis Franklin completed five of eight passes for 94 yards, rushed for 58 yards and scored a touchdown.
- Ohio State 28, Wisconsin 20
- Purdue 20, Illinois 14
- Northwestern 23, Indiana 14
- Iowa 6, Michigan State 6. On a second quarter play, the Spartans appeared to have the Hawkeyes' Dave Harris trapped in the end zone for a safety. However, Harris collided with referee Jerry Markbreit, and three defenders, including Brad Van Pelt, stumbled to the ground with Markbreit. Harris escaped for a 23-yard gain to take Iowa out of danger.

==== November 4 ====
On November 4, 1972, the Big Ten teams played five conference games.

- Michigan 21, Indiana 7. Michigan defeated Indiana, 21–7, in front of a crowd of 41,336 on "a dull, overcast day" at Memorial Stadium in Bloomington, Indiana. Michigan's offense fumbled five times. Bob Thornbladh was Michigan's leading rusher with 97 yards on 25 carries. After the game, coach Schembechler praised the defense, but called it "the poorest offensive game of the year."
- Ohio State 27, Minnesota 19.
- Michigan State 22, Purdue 12. Michigan State upset Purdue, 22–12, before a crowd of 58,649 at Spartan Stadium in East Lansing, Michigan. The game was played the day after Michigan State head coach announced that he would retire at the end of the season. The Spartans held Otis Armstrong to 74 rushing yards and limited Gary Danielson to 123 passing yards. After the game, Spartan co-captain Brad Van Pelt said "you could see it in all of the players' eyes -- there was only one mission. That was to send Duffy out in glory."
- Wisconsin 16, Iowa 14.
- Illinois 43, Northwestern 13.

==== November 11 ====
On November 11, 1972, the Big Ten teams played five conference games.

- Michigan 31, Iowa 0. Michigan defeated Iowa, 31–0, in front of a crowd of 43,176 at Kinnick Stadium in Iowa City. Quarterback Dennis Franklin completed six of 11 passes for 107 yards and threw touchdown passes covering 15 yards to Paul Seal and 37 yards to Gil Chapman. Franklin also rushed for 37 yards and a touchdown. Bob Thornbladh, playing in place of injured Ed Shuttlesworth at fullback, rushed for 98 yards and scored a touchdown. Mike Lantry added a 30-yard field goal and four extra points. With Ohio State losing to Michigan State on the same afternoon, the victory over Iowa gave undefeated Michigan sole possession of first place in the Big Ten standings.
- Michigan State 19, Ohio State 12. Michigan State defeated Ohio State (ranked No. 5 in the AP Poll), 19–12, before a crowd of 76,264 at Spartan Stadium in East Lansing, Michigan. The victory came eight days after Duffy Daugherty announced his intent to retire as Michigan State's head coach. Dirk Krijt, a transfer student from the Netherlands who had never seen an American football before arriving on campus that fall, scored 13 of Michigan State's points on four field goals and an extra point. Mark Niesen scored the winning touchdown on a six-yard run in the third quarter. The Michigan State defense held Ohio State to 176 yards of total offense, including 42 rushing yards by Archie Griffin.
- Purdue 27, Wisconsin 6.
- Minnesota 35, Northwestern 29.
- Illinois 37, Indiana 20.

==== November 18 ====
On November 18, 1972, the Big Ten teams played five conference games.

- Michigan 9, Purdue 6. Michigan defeated Purdue, 9–6, in front of a crowd of 88,423 at Michigan Stadium. Purdue took a 3–0 lead at halftime. Michigan scored a touchdown on its opening drive of the third quarter (an 11-yard pass from Dennis Franklin to Paul Seal), but Mike Lantry missed the extra point kick. At the end of the third quarter, Purdue kicked its second field goal to tie the game at 6–6. With three minutes left in the game, the score remained a tie with Purdue having possession. At that point, Michigan's wolfman and co-captain Randy Logan intercepted a Gary Danielson pass at Michigan's 40-yard line. From there, Dennis Franklin scrambled 19 yards to Purdue's 41-yard line. Tailback Chuck Heater advanced the ball to the Purdue 19-yard line with a 22-yard run. On fourth down, with 64 seconds left in the game, Mike Lantry, a Vietnam veteran who had earlier missed an extra point kick and squibbed a kickoff, kicked a 30-yard field goal to put Michigan in the lead. Purdue's defense held Michigan to 100 rushing yards.
- Ohio State 27, Northwestern 14.
- Minnesota 14, Michigan State 10.
- Indiana 16, Iowa 8.
- Illinois 27, Wisconsin 7.

==== November 25 ====
On November 25, 1972, the Big Ten teams played five conference games.

- Ohio State 14, Michigan 11. Michigan (ranked No. 3 in the AP Poll) lost to Ohio State (ranked No. 9), 14–11, in front of a crowd of 87,040 at Ohio Stadium in Columbus, Ohio. The game was part of The Ten Year War between head coaches Schembechler and Woody Hayes. Mike Lantry missed on 44-yard field goal attempt in the first quarter, but made a 35-yarder in the second quarter. Ohio State took the lead later in the quarter on a one-yard touchdown run by Champ Henson. Shortly before halftime, Michigan drove the ball to the Ohio State one-yard line, but the Ohio State held on three rushes inside the one-yard line, and Dennis Franklin then fumbled on fourth down at the two-yard line. Ohio State extended its lead to 14–3 on a 30-yard touchdown run by Archie Griffin in the third quarter. Later in the third quarter, Ed Shuttlesworth scored with a one-yard run on fourth down. Dennis Franklin completed a pass to Clint Haslerig for a two-point conversion, cutting Ohio State's lead to three points. In a memorable goal-line stand in the fourth quarter, Michigan running back Harry Banks crossed the goal line on a second effort, but the officials ruled the play had been whistled dead inside the one-yard line. Coach Schembechler opted not to kick a field goal that would have tied the game and sent the Wolverines to the 1973 Rose Bowl. Instead, Schembechler called for a quarterback sneak on fourth down, and Randy Gradishar stopped Franklin short of the goal line. The Buckeyes' fans rushed onto the field and tore down the goal posts with 13 seconds remaining. Michigan's defense held Ohio State to one pass completion, and the Wolverines out-gained the Buckeyes with 344 yards of total offense to 179 for Ohio State. However, Michigan's inability to score on two drives inside the Ohio State five-yard line gave the victory to the Buckeyes.
- Purdue 42, Indiana 7.
- Minnesota 14, Wisconsin 6.
- Iowa 15, Illinois 14.
- Michigan State 24, Northwestern 14.

=== Bowl games ===
On January 1, 1973, USC defeated Ohio State, 42–17, in the 1973 Rose Bowl. USC running back Sam Cunningham scored four touchdowns and was named the player of the game.

== Statistical leaders ==
=== Passing yards ===
1. Mitch Anderson, Northwestern (1,335)
2. Rudy Steiner, Wisconsin (1,080)
3. Ted McNulty, Indiana (906)
4. Mike Wells, Illinois (837)
5. Dennis Franklin, Michigan (818)

=== Rushing yards ===
1. Otis Armstrong, Purdue (1,361)
2. John King, Minnesota (1,164)
3. Rufus Ferguson, Wisconsin (1,004)
4. Archie Griffin, Ohio State (867)
5. Champ Henson, Ohio State (795)

=== Receiving yards ===
1. Glenn Scolnik, Indiana (727)
2. Jim Lash, Northwestern (667)
3. Garvin Roberson, Illinois (569)
4. Jeff Mack, Wisconsin (528)
5. Billy Joe DuPree, Michigan State (406)

=== Total yards ===
1. Otis Armstrong, Purdue (1,361)
2. Dennis Franklin, Michigan (1,315)
3. Greg Hare, Ohio State (1,180)
4. Mitch Anderson, Northwestern (1,176)
5. John King, Minnesota (1,164)

=== Scoring ===
1. Champ Henson, Ohio State (120)
2. John King, Minnesota (72)
3. Ed Shuttlesworth, Michigan (66)
4. Otis Armstrong, Purdue (54)
5. Ken Starling, Indiana (48)

== Awards and honors ==
=== All-Big Ten honors ===
The following players were picked by the Associated Press (AP) and/or the United Press International (UPI) as first-team players on the 1972 All-Big Ten Conference football team.

Offense

Position	Name	Team	Selectors
Quarterback	Mike Wells	Illinois	AP, UPI
Running back	Otis Armstrong	Purdue	AP, UPI
Running back	Rufus Ferguson	Wisconsin	AP
Running back	John King	Minnesota	AP
Running back	Ed Shuttlesworth	Michigan	UPI
Flanker	Glenn Scolnik	Indiana	AP [end], UPI
Split end	Jim Lash	Northwestern	UPI
Tight end	Steve Craig	Northwestern	AP [end], UPI
Tight end	Billy Joe DuPree	Michigan State	UPI
Tackle	Paul Seymour	Michigan	AP, UPI
Tackle	John Hicks	Ohio State	AP, UPI
Guard	Joe DeLamielleure	Michigan State	AP, UPI
Guard	Tom Coyle	Michigan	AP, UPI
Guard	Charles Bonica	Ohio State	UPI
Center	Larry McCarren	Illinois	AP, UPI

Defense

Position	Name	Team	Selectors
Lineman	Steve Baumgartner	Purdue	AP [front four], UPI [defensive end]
Lineman	Dave Butz	Purdue	AP [front four], UPI [defensive tackle]
Lineman	Fred Grambau	Michigan	AP [front four], UPI [defensive tackle]
Lineman	George Hasenohrl	Ohio State	AP [front four], UPI [defensive tackle]
Lineman	Clint Spearman	Michigan	UPI [end]
Linebacker	Greg Bingham	Purdue	AP [middle guard], UPI
Linebacker	Gail Clark	Michigan State	AP, UPI
Linebacker	Randy Gradishar	Ohio State	AP, UPI
Linebacker	Dave Lokanc	Wisconsin	AP
Defensive back	Randy Logan	Michigan	AP, UPI
Defensive back	Bill Simpson	Michigan State	AP, UPI
Defensive back	Brad Van Pelt	Michigan State	AP, UPI
Defensive back	Dave Brown	Michigan	UPI

=== All-American honors ===
At the end of the 1972 season, Big Ten players secured six of the consensus first-team picks for the 1972 College Football All-America Team. The Big Ten's consensus All-Americans were:

Position	Name	Team	Selectors
Defensive back	Brad Van Pelt	Michigan State	AFCA, AP, FWAA, NEA, UPI, WCFF, Time, TSN
Defensive tackle	Dave Butz	Purdue	AFCA, NEA, UPI, WCFF, Time, TSN
Running back	Otis Armstrong	Purdue	AP, FWAA, UPI, WCFF, TSN
Linebacker	Randy Gradishar	Ohio State	AFCA, AP, FWAA, UPI, FN
Offensive tackle	Paul Seymour	Michigan	AFCA, FWAA, NEA, Time, TSN
Defensive back	Randy Logan	Michigan	AFCA, UPI, WCFF, FN

Other Big Ten players who were named first-team All-Americans by at least one selector were:

Position	Name	Team	Selectors
Offensive tackle	John Hicks	Ohio State	AP, WCFF, NEA [offensive guard]
Offensive guard	Joe DeLamielleure	Michigan State	TSN
Defensive tackle	George Hasenohrl	Ohio State	FN
Placekicker	Chris Gartner	Indiana	TSN

=== Other awards ===
Running back Otis Armstrong of Purdue finished eighth in the voting for the 1972 Heisman Trophy.

== 1973 NFL draft ==
The following Big Ten players were among the first 100 picks in the 1973 NFL draft:

Name	Position	Team	Round	Overall pick
Dave Butz	Defensive tackle	Purdue	1	5
Paul Seymour	Tight end	Michigan	1	7
Otis Armstrong	Running back	Purdue	1	9
Darryl Stingley	Wide receiver	Purdue	1	19
Billy Joe Dupree	Tight end	Michigan State	1	20
Joe DeLamielleure	Guard	Michigan State	1	26
Brad Van Pelt	Linebacker	Michigan State	2	40
Gary Hrivnak	Defensive tackle	Purdue	2	48
Steve Baumgartner	Defensive end	Purdue	2	51
Randy Logan	Defensive back	Michigan	3	55
Jim Lash	Wide receiver	Northwestern	3	65
Tom MacLeod	Linebacker	Minnesota	3	74
Gregg Bingham	Linebacker	Purdue	4	79
Mike Wells	Quarterback	Illinois	4	80
