= 1972 Michigan Wolverines football team =

American college football season

1972 Michigan Wolverines football

Big Ten co-champion
- Conference: Big Ten Conference

Ranking
- Coaches: No. 6
- AP: No. 6
- Record: 10–1 (7–1 Big Ten)
- Head coach: Bo Schembechler (4th season)
- Defensive coordinator: Jim Young (4th season)
- MVP: Randy Logan
- Captains: Tom Coyle; Randy Logan
- Home stadium: Michigan Stadium

1972 Big Ten Conference football standings
	Conf.					Overall
Team	W		L		T	W		L		T
No. 6 Michigan +	7	–	1	–	0	10	–	1	–	0
No. 9 Ohio State +	7	–	1	–	0	9	–	2	–	0
Purdue	6	–	2	–	0	6	–	5	–	0
Michigan State	5	–	2	–	1	5	–	5	–	1
Minnesota	4	–	4	–	0	4	–	7	–	0
Indiana	3	–	5	–	0	5	–	6	–	0
Illinois	3	–	5	–	0	3	–	8	–	0
Iowa	2	–	6	–	1	3	–	7	–	1
Wisconsin	2	–	6	–	0	4	–	7	–	0
Northwestern	1	–	8	–	0	2	–	9	–	0
+ – Conference co-champions; Rankings from AP Poll

The 1972 Michigan Wolverines football team was an American football team that represented the University of Michigan in the 1972 Big Ten Conference football season. In their fourth season under head coach Bo Schembechler, the Wolverines compiled a 10–1 record, outscored opponents 264–57, and were ranked sixth in both final polls (Coaches and AP). Offensive guard Tom Coyle and defensive back Randy Logan were the team captains.

Michigan won its first ten games with four conference shutouts (Northwestern, Michigan State, Minnesota, Iowa), and was ranked third in the AP Poll prior to its 14–11 road loss to rival Ohio State in late November.

Two Wolverines were consensus first-team All-Americans: senior team captain Randy Logan and offensive tackle Paul Seymour. Schembecher won the first Big Ten Football Coach of the Year Award based on a poll of news media covering the conference.

== Schedule ==
Date	Time	Opponent	Rank	Site	TV	Result	Attendance
September 16		Northwestern	No. 11	Michigan Stadium; Ann Arbor, MI (rivalry)		W 7–0	71,757
September 23		at No. 6 UCLA*	No. 12	Los Angeles Memorial Coliseum; Los Angeles, CA		W 26–9	57,129
September 30		No. 18 Tulane*	No. 8	Michigan Stadium; Ann Arbor, MI		W 41–7	84,162
October 7	1:30 p.m.	Navy*	No. 5	Michigan Stadium; Ann Arbor, MI		W 35–7	81,131
October 14		Michigan State	No. 5	Michigan Stadium; Ann Arbor, MI (rivalry)		W 10–0	103,735
October 21		at Illinois	No. 6	Memorial Stadium; Champaign, Il (rivalry)		W 31–7	64,290
October 28		Minnesota^{†}	No. 5	Michigan Stadium; Ann Arbor, MI (Little Brown Jug)		W 42–0	84,190
November 4		at Indiana	No. 4	Memorial Stadium; Bloomington, IN		W 21–7	41,336
November 11		at Iowa	No. 4	Kinnick Stadium; Iowa City, IA		W 31–0	43,176
November 18		Purdue	No. 3	Michigan Stadium; Ann Arbor, MI		W 9–6	88,423
November 25		at No. 9 Ohio State	No. 3	Ohio Stadium; Columbus, OH (The Game)	ABC	L 11–14	87,040
*Non-conference game; ^{†}Homecoming; Rankings from AP Poll released prior to the game; All times are in Eastern time

== Rankings ==
Ranking movements Legend: ██ Increase in ranking ██ Decrease in ranking ( ) = First-place votes
	Week														
Poll	Pre	1	2	3	4	5	6	7	8	9	10	11	12	13	Final
AP	10	11	12	8 (1)	5 (1)	5	6 (1)	5 (1)	4 (1)	4 (1)	3 (3)	3 (1)	7	8	6
Coaches	10	10	11	8	6	6	6	5	5	5	3	3	6	6	Not released

== Season summary ==
=== Preseason ===
The 1971 team compiled an 11–1 record, outscored opponents 421 to 83, won the Big Ten Conference championship, and was ranked #4 in the final Coaches Poll and #6 in the final AP Poll. The Wolverines lost 13 starters from the 1971 team, including Mike Taylor, a consensus All-American linebacker, Reggie McKenzie, a consensus All-American at offensive guard, Billy Taylor, who set Michigan's career rushing record with 3,072 yards, and defensive back Thom Darden.

On offense, the Wolverines' priorities going into the 1972 season included the development of a passing game, as Tom Slade, Larry Cipa and Kevin Casey had combined for less than 700 passing yards in 1971. Shortly before the season opener, coach Schembechler announced that sophomore Dennis Franklin would be the starting quarterback.

With the loss of Billy Taylor, the Wolverines lacked a power running attack, and another priority was the development of a speed and quickness attack led by Gil Chapman and Harry Banks. The highlight of the spring game was a 60-yard pass play from Franklin to Chapman. Schembechler was quoted as saying of Chapman, "He's the fastest player I've ever had at Michigan." Alan "Cowboy" Walker, who gained 403 yards in 1971, had been expected to be the Wolverines' lead tailback, but he quit the team before the season started.

Two days before the season opener, former Michigan head coach Harry Kipke died at age 73.

=== Northwestern ===
Week 1: Northwestern at Michigan

Team	1	2	3	4	Total
Northwestern	0	0	0	0	0
• Michigan	0	7	0	0	7

- Date: September 16
- Location: Ann Arbor, MI
- Game attendance: 71,757

Scoring summary
2	MICH	Rather 21-yard pass from Franklin (Lantry kick)	Michigan 7–0

On September 16, Michigan opened its 1972 season with a 7–0 victory over Northwestern before a crowd of 71,757 at Michigan Stadium. The Wolverines had been favored by 21 points, and their seven-point tally was the fewest scored by a Michigan team since 1967.

Michigan's seven points were scored on a 21-yard touchdown pass from Dennis Franklin to Bo Rather and an extra point kick by Mike Lantry. Michigan's touchdown was set up by an interception by Michigan linebacker Craig Mutch which he returned 18 yards to Northwestern's 31-yard line. Coach Schembechler called Mutch's interception the "key play of the game." Ed Shuttlesworth led Michigan's ground game with 75 yards on 17 carries. Northwestern's Jim Trimble rushed for 103 yards on 20 carries. The game featured two firsts in Michigan football history. First, Dennis Franklin, starting his first game, became the first African-American quarterback to play for Michigan; Franklin completed four of nine passes for 60 yards and a touchdown. Second, the game was the first played in front of a sexually integrated Michigan Marching Band. Prior to 1972, the band had been an all-male unit. The 1972 band included six female musicians and a female twirler.

=== At UCLA ===
Week 2: Michigan at UCLA

Team	1	2	3	4	Total
• Michigan	7	6	7	6	26
UCLA	0	3	6	0	9

- Date: September 23
- Location: Los Angeles
- Game attendance: 57,129

On September 23, #11 Michigan defeated #6 UCLA, 26–9, in front of a crowd of 57,129 at the Los Angeles Memorial Coliseum. UCLA was led by quarterback Mark Harmon, a junior college transfer and the son of Michigan legend Tom Harmon, and had opened the season two weeks earlier with a late night home upset of #1 Nebraska, halting the Huskers' unbeaten streak at 32 games.

Michigan rushed for 381 yards, including 115 yards and two touchdowns by Ed Shuttlesworth, 78 yards and a touchdown by Harry Banks, 75 yards by Dennis Franklin, and 26 yards and a touchdown by Clint Haslerig. Mike Lantry successfully converted two of four extra point kicks.

=== Tulane ===
Week 3: Tulane at Michigan

Team	1	2	3	4	Total
Tulane	0	0	0	7	7
• Michigan	21	0	6	14	41

- Date: September 30
- Location: Ann Arbor, MI
- Game attendance: 84,162

On September 30, Michigan defeated Tulane, 41–7, in front of a crowd of 84,162 at Michigan Stadium. Michigan rushed for 298 yards, including 151 yards and three touchdowns by Ed Shuttlesworth, 51 yards by Chuck Heater, and 17 yards and a touchdown by Bob Thornbladh. Three Michigan quarterbacks also completed five of 12 passes for 50 yards. In addition, Gil Chapman returned a punt 49 yards and Randy Logan returned an interception 32 yards for touchdowns. Chapman returned seven punts in all for 90 yards. On defense, Michigan held Tulane to 56 rushing yards. Tulane did not score until the fourth quarter against Michigan's second- and third-string players.

=== Navy ===
Week 4: Navy at Michigan

Team	1	2	3	4	Total
Navy	0	0	0	7	7
• Michigan	0	7	28	0	35

- Date: October 7
- Location: Michigan Stadium
- Game attendance: 81,131

Scoring summary
2	MICH	Franklin 6-yard run (Lantry kick)	Michigan 7-0
3	MICH	Rather 9-yard pass from Franklin (Lantry kick)	Michigan 14-0
3	MICH	Brown 83-yard punt return (Lantry kick)	Michigan 21-0
3	MICH	Heater 13-yard run (Lantry kick)	Michigan 28-0
3	MICH	Seal 10-yard pass from Franklin (Lantry kick)	Michigan 35-0
4	NAVY	Robin Ameen 3-yard pass from Allen Glenny (Lanning kick)	Michigan 35–7

On October 7, Michigan defeated Navy, 35–7, in front of a crowd of 81,131 at Michigan Stadium. Quarterback Dennis Franklin ran six yards around the left end for the first touchdown in the second quarter. Michigan scored 28 points in the third quarter. The quarter began with Navy's Ike Owens fumbling the opening kickoff after being hit by defensive end Mark Jacoby. Franklin then threw a nine-yard touchdown pass to Bo Rather. Four minutes later, Dave Brown scored on an 83-yard punt return for touchdown, tying a Michigan school record. Chuck Heater scored next on a 13-yard run around left end on an option pitchout from Franklin. Michigan scored its fourth touchdown of the third quarter on a 10-yard touchdown pass from Franklin to Paul Seal. Mike Lantry successfully converted five of five extra points. Michigan led 35-0 at the end of the third quarter, but Navy scored a late touchdown on a short pass.

=== Michigan State ===
Week 5: Michigan State at Michigan

Team	1	2	3	4	Total
Michigan St	0	0	0	0	0
• Michigan	0	3	0	7	10

- Date: October 14
- Location: Ann Arbor, MI
- Game attendance: 103,735

Scoring summary
2	MICH	Lantry 22-yard field goal	Michigan 3-0
4	MICH	Chapman 58-yard run (Lantry kick)	Michigan 10-0

On October 14, Michigan defeated Michigan State, 10–0, in front of a crowd of 103,735 at Michigan Stadium. The game was Michigan's first shutout victory over Michigan State since 1947. Michigan scored on a 22-yard field goal by Mike Lantry in the second quarter and a 58-yard touchdown run by Gil Chapman in the fourth quarter. The Wolverines totaled 334 rushing yards, including 107 by Ed Shuttlesworth, 81 by Chuck Heater, and 64 by Dennis Franklin. The Spartans had a 24-yard touchdown run called back due to a clipping penalty, and their only other scoring threat ended when a hit from Dave Brown forced the Spartans' ball carrier to fumble into the end zone.

=== At Illinois ===
Week 6: Michigan at Illinois

Team	1	2	3	4	Total
• Michigan	7	17	7	0	31
Illinois	0	0	7	0	7

- Date: October 21
- Location: Memorial Stadium, Champaign, IL
- Game attendance: 64,290

On October 20, Michigan defeated Illinois, 31–7, in front of a crowd of 64,290 for the homecoming game at Memorial Stadium in Champaign, Illinois. The victory was Michigan's sixth in a row against Illinois. Sophomore tailback Chuck Heater led Michigan's rushing attack with 155 yards on 29 carries with touchdown runs in the first and second quarters. Quarterback Dennis Franklin completed seven of 12 passes for 105 yards, but he also had three turnovers – a fumble on the first play from scrimmage and two interceptions. Ed Shuttlesworth contributed 70 rushing yards on 12 carries with a touchdown in the second quarter. Mike Lantry added a 31-yard field goal in the second quarter, and Michigan led 24-0 at halftime. Illinois scored late in the third quarter on an 18-yard run by George Uremovich, and Gil Chapman responded with a 73-yard kickoff return after the Illini touchdown.

=== Minnesota ===
Week 7: Minnesota at Michigan

Team	1	2	3	4	Total
Minnesota	0	0	0	0	0
• Michigan	14	14	14	0	42

- Date: October 28
- Location: Ann Arbor, MI

Scoring summary
1	MICH	Shuttlesworth 1-yard run (Lantry kick)	Michigan 7-0
1	MICH	Shuttlesworth 4-yard run (Lantry kick)	Michigan 14–0
2	MICH	Shuttlesworth 4-yard run (Lantry kick)	Michigan 21–0
2	MICH	Shuttlesworth 1-yard run (Lantry kick)	Michigan 28–0
3	MICH	Brown 68-yard interception return (Lantry kick)	Michigan 35-0
3	MICH	Franklin 1-yard run (Lantry kick)	Michigan 42-0

On October 28, 1972, Michigan defeated Minnesota, 42–0, in front of a crowd of 84,190 at Michigan Stadium. Michigan's 42 points were its highest total of the season. Fullback Ed Shuttlesworth rushed for 86 yards on 19 carries and scored Michigan's first four touchdowns. Quarterback Dennis Franklin completed five of eight passes for 94 yards, rushed for 58 yards and scored a touchdown. Placekicker Mike Lantry converted all six extra points.

=== At Indiana ===
On November 4, Michigan defeated Indiana, 21–7, in front of a crowd of 41,336 on "a dull, overcast day" at Memorial Stadium, Bloomington, Indiana. Michigan's offense fumbled five times, playing without the team's leading rusher, Ed Shuttlesworth. Adding to the offensive woes, Dennis Franklin completed only two of 14 passes for 27 yards. Franklin ran nine yards for a touchdown in the second quarter, but Indiana tied the game at 7–7 early in the fourth quarter. Later in the fourth quarter, Michigan regained the lead on a 12-yard touchdown run by Franklin and then extended the lead on a 10-yard touchdown run by Chuck Heater. Bob Thornbladh, playing for the injured Shuttlesworth at fullback, was Michigan's leading rusher with 97 yards on 25 carries. Franklin totaled 85 rushing yards and two touchdowns on 24 carries. Mike Lantry kicked three extra points but missed a field goal attempt. After the game, coach Schembechler praised the defense, but called it "the poorest offensive game of the year."

=== At Iowa ===
Week 9: Michigan at Iowa

Team	1	2	3	4	Total
• Michigan	10	7	14	0	31
Iowa	0	0	0	0	0

- Date: November 11
- Location: Iowa City
- Game attendance: 43,176

Scoring summary
Q1		MICH	Thornbladh 5 yard run (Lantry kick)	MICH 7–0
Q1	3:00	MICH	Lantry 30 yard field goal	MICH 10–0
Q2		MICH	Seal 15 yard pass from Franklin (Lantry kick)	MICH 17–0
Q3		MICH	Franklin 1 yard run (Lantry kick)	MICH 24–0
Q3		MICH	Chapman 37 yard pass from Franklin (Lantry kick)	MICH 31–0

On November 11, Michigan defeated Iowa, 31–0, in front of a crowd of 43,176 at the recently renamed Kinnick Stadium in Iowa City. Quarterback Dennis Franklin completed six of 11 passes for 107 yards and threw touchdown passes covering 15 yards to Paul Seal and 37 yards to Gil Chapman. Franklin also rushed for 37 yards and a touchdown. Bob Thornbladh, playing in place of injured Ed Shuttlesworth at fullback, rushed for 98 yards and scored a touchdown. Mike Lantry added a 30-yard field goal and four extra points. With Ohio State losing to Michigan State on the same afternoon, the victory over Iowa gave undefeated Michigan sole possession of first place in the Big Ten Conference standings.

=== Purdue ===
Week 10: Purdue at Michigan

Team	1	2	3	4	Total
Purdue	0	3	3	0	6
• Michigan	0	0	6	3	9

- Date: November 18
- Location: Ann Arbor, MI
- Game attendance: 88,423

Scoring summary
Q2		PUR	Connor 25 yard field goal	PUR 3–0
Q3		MICH	Seal 11 yard pass from Franklin (kick failed)	MICH 6–3
Q3		PUR	Connor 20 yard field goal	Tie 6–6
Q4	1:04	MICH	Lantry 30 yard field goal	MICH 9–6

On November 18, Michigan defeated Purdue, 9–6, in front of a crowd of 88,423 at Michigan Stadium. Purdue featured College Football Hall of Famers Dave Butz and Otis Armstrong, quarterback Gary Danielson, and receiver Darryl Stingley. Purdue took a 3–0 lead at halftime. Michigan scored a touchdown on its opening drive of the third quarter (an 11-yard pass from Dennis Franklin to Paul Seal), but Mike Lantry missed the extra point kick. At the end of the third quarter, Purdue kicked its second field goal to tie the game at 6–6. With three minutes left in the game, the score remained a tie with Purdue having possession. At that point, Michigan's wolfman and co-captain Randy Logan intercepted a Danielson pass at Michigan's 40-yard line. From there, Dennis Franklin scrambled 19 yards to Purdue's 41-yard line. Tailback Chuck Heater advanced the ball to the Purdue 19-yard line with a 22-yard run. On fourth down, with 64 seconds left in the game, Mike Lantry, a Vietnam veteran who had earlier missed an extra point kick and squibbed a kickoff, kicked a 30-yard field goal to put Michigan in the lead. Purdue's defense held Michigan to 100 rushing yards, including 35 yards for Heater and 34 yards for Bob Thornbladh. Dennis Franklin completed 10 of 15 passes for 143 yards.

=== Ohio State ===
Michigan Wolverines at Ohio State Buckeyes

Quarter	1	2	3	4	Total
Michigan	0	3	8	0	11
Ohio St	0	7	7	0	14

at Ohio Stadium, Columbus, Ohio

- Date: November 25, 1972
- Game time: 1:30 p.m.
- Game weather: Rain, 39 °F (4 °C)
- Game attendance: 87,040
- Referee: Ross Dean (Big Ten)
- TV announcers (ABC): Chris Schenkel, Bud Wilkinson
- Box Score

Game information

Second quarter

- MICH – Mike Lantry 35-yard field goal, 14:13. Michigan 3–0. Drive: 5 plays, 43 yards, 1:36.
- OSU – Champ Henson 1-yard run (Blair Conway kick), 4:30. Ohio St 7–3. Drive: 8 plays, 46 yards, 3:44.

Third quarter

- OSU – Archie Griffin 30-yard run (Blair Conway kick), 12:32. Ohio St 14–3. Drive: 6 plays, 78 yards, 2:18.
- MICH – Ed Shuttlesworth 1-yard run (pass good), 4:48. Ohio St 14–11. Drive: 13 plays, 58 yards, 7:35.

Top passers

- MICH – Dennis Franklin – 13/23, 160 yards
- OSU – Greg Hare – 1/3, 17 yards, INT

Top rushers

- MICH – Chuck Heater – 14 rushes, 65 yards
- OSU – Archie Griffin – 17 rushes, 75 yards, TD

Top receivers

- MICH – Paul Seal – 4 receptions, 60 yards
- OSU – Archie Griffin – 1 reception, 17 yards

On November 25, Michigan, ranked #3 in the AP Poll, lost 14–11 at #9 Ohio State in front of a crowd of 87,040 at Ohio Stadium. The game is one of the classic matches in The Ten Year War between head coaches Schembechler and Woody Hayes. Michigan had defeated Ohio State the prior year by a 10–7 score.

Mike Lantry missed on 44-yard field goal attempt in the first quarter, but made a 35-yarder in the second quarter. Ohio State took the lead later in the quarter on a one-yard touchdown run by Champ Henson. Shortly before halftime, Michigan drove the ball to the Ohio State one-yard line, but the Ohio State held on three rushes inside the one-yard line, and Dennis Franklin then fumbled on fourth down at the two-yard line.

Ohio State extended its lead to 14–3 on a 30-yard touchdown run by Archie Griffin in the third quarter. Later in the third quarter, Ed Shuttlesworth scored with a one-yard run on fourth down. Dennis Franklin completed a pass to Clint Haslerig for a two-point conversion, cutting Ohio State's lead to three points. In a memorable goal-line stand in the fourth quarter, Michigan running back Harry Banks crossed the goal line on a second effort, but the officials ruled the play had been whistled dead inside the one-yard line. Coach Schembechler opted not to kick a field goal that would have tied the game and sent the Wolverines to the 1973 Rose Bowl. Instead, Schembechler called for a quarterback sneak on fourth down, and Randy Gradishar stopped Franklin short of the goal line. The Buckeyes' fans rushed onto the field and tore down the goal posts with 13 seconds remaining.

Franklin completed 13 of 23 passes for 160 yards and also rushed for 30 yards. Michigan's defense held Ohio State to one pass completion, and the Wolverines out-gained the Buckeyes with 344 yards of total offense to 179 for Ohio State. However, Michigan's inability to score on two drives inside the Ohio State five-yard line gave the victory to the Buckeyes.

Scoring summary

Quarter	Time	Drive			Team	Scoring information	Score	
Quarter	Time	Plays	Yards	TOP	Team	Scoring information	MICH	OSU
2	14:13	5	43	1:36	Michigan	35-yard field goal by Lantry	3	0
2	4:30	8	46	3:44	Ohio St	Henson 1-yard touchdown run, Conway kick good	3	7
3	12:32	6	78	2:18	Ohio St	Griffin 30-yard touchdown run, Conway kick good	3	14
3	4:48	13	58	7:35	Michigan	Shuttlesworth 1-yard touchdown run, 2-point pass good	11	14
"TOP" = time of possession. For other American football terms, see Glossary of American football.							11	14

=== Post-season ===
Prior to the 1975 season, the Big Ten and Pac-8 conferences allowed only one postseason participant each, for the Rose Bowl. With a 10–1 record in 1972, Michigan did not play in a bowl game, despite its top ten ranking (#8 AP, #6 UPI) at the end of the regular season.

Two Michigan players, defensive back Randy Logan and offensive tackle Paul Seymour, were consensus first-team selections for the 1972 College Football All-America Team. In addition, 11 Michigan players received honors on the 1972 All-Big Ten Conference football team: Seymour (AP-1, UPI-1), Logan (AP-1, UPI-1), offensive guard Tom Coyle (AP-1, UPI-1), defensive lineman Fred Grambau (AP-1, UPI-1), defensive back Dave Brown, (AP-2, UPI-1), defensive end Clint Spearman (UPI-1), fullback Ed Shuttlesworth (UPI-1), quarterback Dennis Franklin (AP-2, UPI-2), linebacker Tom Kee (AP-2, UPI-2), offensive tackle Jim Coode (UPI-2), and center Bill Hart (AP-2).

At the Michigan football bust in Detroit on December 4, Randy Logan was presented with the Lewis B. Hyde Memorial Award as the most valuable player on the 1972 team, based on the vote of his teammates.

On December 11, Michigan's defensive coordinator Jim Young was hired as the head coach for the University of Arizona Wildcats football team. Offensive line coach Larry Smith and graduate assistant Mike Hankwitz also left the Michigan staff in December 1972 to join Young in Arizona. Four weeks later, Michigan hired Jack Harbaugh as its defensive backs coach, beginning a long connection between the Harbaugh family and the Michigan football program.

On January 3, 1973, the Associated Press released its final rankings for the 1972 season. Undefeated USC received all fifty first-place votes, with Michigan ranked sixth and Ohio State ninth.

On January 24, 1973, Schembecher was announced as the winner of the first Big Ten Football Coach of the Year Award. The award was based on a poll of news media covering the conference. Three days later, Michigan athletic director Don Canham announced that Schembechler, who had compiled a 38-6 record in his first four seasons at Michigan, had been granted a new five-year contract.

==== NFL draft ====
In the 1973 NFL draft, the following Michigan players were selected:

Round	Selection	Player	Position	Franchise
1	7	Paul Seymour	Tight end	Buffalo Bills
3	55	Randy Logan	Defensive back	Buffalo Bills
4	104	Bo Rather	Wide receiver	Miami Dolphins
5	120	Fred Grambau	Defensive end	Kansas City Chiefs
13	335	Clint Spearman	Linebacker	Los Angeles Rams
16	395	Bill Hart	Center	Chicago Bears

- Draft was held January 30–31 in New York City.

== Players ==
=== Offensive letter winners ===
The following players won varsity letters for their participation on the team's offensive unit. Players who were starters in at least half of the team's games are shown with their names in bold.

- Harry Banks, tailback, junior, Cleveland, Ohio - started 4 games at tailback
- Gil Chapman, wing back, sophomore, Elizabeth, New Jersey - started 5 games at split end
- Larry Cipa, quarterback, senior, Cincinnati, Ohio
- Gary R. Coakley, split end, senior, Detroit, Michigan
- **Jim Coode**, offensive tackle, junior, Mayfield Heights, Ohio - started all 12 games at left tackle
- **Thomas J. Coyle**, offensive guard, senior, Chicago, Illinois - started all 12 games at right guard
- John W. Daniels, split end, senior, Newark, Ohio - started 1 game at split end
- Greg DenBoer, tight end, sophomore, Kentwood, Michigan
- **Dennis Franklin**, quarterback, sophomore, Massillon, Ohio - started all 12 games at quarterback
- Dennis Franks, center, sophomore, Bethel Park, Pennsylvania
- Larry Gustafson, wing back, junior, Mays Landing, New Jersey
- Gary Hainrihar, center, junior, Cicero, Illinois
- **William J. "Bill" Hart**, center, senior, Rockford, Michigan - started all 12 games at center
- **Clint Haslerig**, wing back, junior, Cincinnati, Ohio - started all 12 games at wing back
- **Chuck Heater**, tailback, sophomore, Tiffin, Ohio - started 8 games at tailback
- **Mike Hoban**, offensive guard, junior, Chicago, Illinois - started 11 games at left guard
- Charles J. Kupec, tight end, sophomore, Oak Lawn, Illinois
- Mike Lantry, place-kicker, sophomore, Oxford, Michigan
- David F. Metz, offensive guard, sophomore, Harrison, Ohio
- Thomas Poplawski, offensive tackle, senior, Warren, Michigan
- **Bo Rather**, split end, senior, Sandusky, Ohio - started 6 games at split end
- Gerald F. "Jerry" Schumacher, offensive guard, senior, Chicago, Illinois - started 1 game at left guard
- **Paul Seal**, tight end, junior, Detroit, Michigan - started all 12 games at tight end
- **Paul Seymour**, tight end, senior, Berkley, Michigan - started 11 games at right tackle
- **Ed Shuttlesworth**, fullback, junior Cincinnati, Ohio - started 8 games at fullback
- Tom Slade, quarterback, junior, Saginaw, Michigan
- Bob Thornbladh, fullback, junior, Plymouth, Michigan - started 4 games at fullback
- Curtis Tucker, offensive tackle, junior, Cleveland, Ohio

=== Defensive letter winners ===
The following players won varsity letters for their participation on the team's defensive unit. Players who were starters in at least half of the team's games are shown with their names in bold.

- **Dave Brown**, safety, sophomore, Akron, Ohio - started all 12 games at safety
- **Roy W. Burks**, defensive back, sophomore, Midland, Michigan - started all 12 games at strong-side defensive halfback
- **Don Coleman**, defensive end, junior, Daly City, Ohio - started 10 games at right defensive end
- **Barry Dotzauer**, defensive back, junior, Cincinnati, Ohio - started 11 games at weak-side defensive halfback
- Gregory A. Ellis, middle guard, senior, Connersville, Indiana
- **Dave Gallagher**, defensive tackle, junior, Piqua, Ohio - started all 12 games at right defensive tackle
- **Fred Grambau**, defensive tackle, senior, Ossineke, Michigan - started 11 games at left defensive tackle
- Linwood Harden, defensive back, sophomore, Detroit, Michigan
- Bill Hoban, defensive end, sophomore, Chicago, Illinois
- James D. Johnston, wolf, junior, Dallas, Texas
- **Thomas G. Kee**, linebacker, senior, Wheaton, Illinois - started all 12 games at outside linebacker
- Gregory Koss, safety, junior, Cuyahoga Falls, Ohio
- **Randy Logan**, wolf, senior, Detroit, Michigan - started all 12 games at wolfman
- **Craig A. Mutch**, linebacker, junior, Detroit, Michigan - started 11 games at middle linebacker
- John A. Pighee, safety, senior, Cleveland Ohio
- Carl Russ, linebacker, sophomore, Muskegon Heights, Michigan
- Walter E. Sexton, middle guard, junior, Massapequa, New York - started 1 games at right offensive tackle
- Tony L. Smith, defensive tackle, senior, Detroit, Michigan - started 1 game at left defensive tackle
- **Clinton Spearman**, defensive end, senior, Hamilton, Ohio - started 11 games at left defensive end
- Steve Strinko, linebacker, sophomore, Middletown, Ohio - started 1 game at middle linebacker
- Douglas Troszak, defensive tackle, junior, Warren, Michigan
- Walter Williamson, defensive end, junior, Detroit, Michigan started 1 game at left defensive end, 1 game at right defensive end
- David Zuccarelli, wolf, senior, Chicago, Illinois

=== Others ===
The following players did not win varsity letters, but participated as backups or as members of the junior varsity (JV) or all freshman (AF) teams.

- Gordon Bell (AF), running back, freshman, Troy, Ohio
- Dave Brandon, defensive end (JV), junior, Plymouth, Michigan
- Kevin Casey, quarterback, junior, Grand Rapids, Michigan
- Thomas E. Drake, defensive back, junior, Midland, Michigan - started 1 game at weak-side defensive halfback
- Don Dufek, defensive back (AF), freshman, East Grand Rapids, Michigan
- Dan Jilek, linebacker (AF), freshman, Sterling Heights, Michigan
- Larry L. Johnson, defensive end, junior, Munster, Indiana - started one game at right defensive end
- Les Miles, offensive lineman (AF), freshman, Elyria, Ohio
- Calvin O'Neal, linebacker (AF), freshman, Saginaw, Michigan
- Geoffrey Steger, wolf, junior, Winnetka, Illinois

=== Awards and honors ===
- All-Americans: Randy Logan, Paul Seymour
- All-Big Ten: Paul Seymour (AP-1, UPI-1), Randy Logan (AP-1, UPI-1), Tom Coyle (AP-1, UPI-1), Fred Grambau (AP-1, UPI-1), Dave Brown, (AP-2, UPI-1), Clint Spearman (UPI-1), Ed Shuttlesworth (UPI-1), Dennis Franklin (AP-2, UPI-2), Tom Kee (AP-2, UPI-2), Jim Coode (UPI-2), Bill Hart (AP-2)
- Most Valuable Player: Randy Logan
- Meyer Morton Award: Randy Logan
- John Maulbetsch Award: Dennis Franklin
- Frederick Matthei Award: Tom Drake
- Arthur Robinson Scholarship Award: Dave Zucarelli

=== Depth chart ===
**Defense**

FS
Randy Logan
⋅

WLB	SLB
⋅	⋅
⋅	⋅

SS
Dave Brown
⋅

CB
Barry Dotzauer
Tom Drake

DE	DT	NT	DT	DE
Don Coleman	Dave Gallagher	Gregory Ellis	Fred Grambeau	Clint Spearman
Larry Johnson	⋅	Walt Sexton	Tony Smith	Walt Williamson

CB
Roy Burks
⋅

**Offense**

SE
Bo Rather
Gil Chapman

LT	LG	C	RG	RT
Jim Coode	Mike Hoban	Bill Hart	Tom Coyle	Paul Seymour
⋅	Jerry Schumacher	⋅	⋅	⋅

TE
Paul Seal
⋅

WB
Clint Haslerig
⋅

QB
Dennis Franklin
⋅

RB
Chuck Heater
Harry Banks

FB
Ed Shuttlesworth
Bob Thornbladh

Special teams
**PK** Mike Lantry

== Statistical leaders ==
=== Rushing ===
Player	Attempts	Net yards	Yards per attempt	Touchdowns	Long
Ed Shuttlesworth	157	713	4.5	11	23
Chuck Heater	140	669	4.8	4	22
Dennis Franklin	142	497	3.5	5	29

=== Passing ===
Player	Attempts	Completions	Interceptions	Comp %	Yards	Yds/Comp	TD	Long
Dennis Franklin	123	59	2	48.0	818	13.9	6	52
Larry Cipa	11	4	1	36.4	51	12.8	0	

=== Receiving ===
Player	Receptions	Yards	Yds/Recp	TD	Long
Paul Seal	18	243	13.5	3	35
Bo Rather	15	197	13.1	2	24
Clint Haslerig	9	175	19.4	0	52

=== Kickoff returns ===
Player	Returns	Yards	Yds/Return	TD	Long
Gil Chapman	8	276	34.5	1	73
Chuck Heater	2	62	31.0	0	40
Clint Haslerig	2	40	20.0	0	24

=== Punt returns ===
Player	Returns	Yards	Yds/Return	TD	Long
David Brown	11	189	17.2	1	83
Gil Chapman	20	180	9.0	1	

== Coaching staff ==
- Head coach: Bo Schembechler
- Assistant coaches

- Offensive assistants: Chuck Stobart (offensive coordinator and backs), Larry Smith (offensive line), Jerry Hanlon (offensive line)
- Defensive assistants: Jim Young (defensive coordinator), Frank Maloney (defensive line), Gary Moeller (defensive backs), George Mans (defensive ends)
- Other assistants: Dennis Brown (head freshman coach), Tirrel Burton (freshman coach), Mike Hankwitz (graduate assistant)

- Trainer: Lindsy McLean
- Manager: David Fish
