= 1972 Michigan State Spartans football team =

American college football season

1972 Michigan State Spartans football
- Conference: Big Ten Conference
- Record: 5–5–1 (5–2–1 Big Ten)
- Head coach: Duffy Daugherty (19th season)
- Defensive coordinator: Denny Stolz (2nd season)
- MVP: Gail Clark
- Captains: Billy Joe DuPree; Brad Van Pelt
- Home stadium: Spartan Stadium

1972 Big Ten Conference football standings
	Conf.					Overall
Team	W		L		T	W		L		T
No. 6 Michigan +	7	–	1	–	0	10	–	1	–	0
No. 9 Ohio State +	7	–	1	–	0	9	–	2	–	0
Purdue	6	–	2	–	0	6	–	5	–	0
Michigan State	5	–	2	–	1	5	–	5	–	1
Minnesota	4	–	4	–	0	4	–	7	–	0
Indiana	3	–	5	–	0	5	–	6	–	0
Illinois	3	–	5	–	0	3	–	8	–	0
Iowa	2	–	6	–	1	3	–	7	–	1
Wisconsin	2	–	6	–	0	4	–	7	–	0
Northwestern	1	–	8	–	0	2	–	9	–	0
+ – Conference co-champions; Rankings from AP Poll

The 1972 Michigan State Spartans football team was an American football team that represented Michigan State University as a member of the Big Ten Conference during the 1972 Big Ten football season. In their 19th and final season under head coach Duffy Daugherty, the Spartans compiled a 5–5–1 record (5–2–1 in conference games), finished in fourth place in the Big Ten, and outscored opponents by a total of 158 to 156. In four games against ranked opponents, they lost to No. 1 USC, No. 7 Notre Dame and No. 5 Michigan, and defeated No. 5 Ohio State.

On offense, the Spartans gained an average of 228.0 rushing yards and 65.8 passing yards per game. On defense, they gave up 151.1 rushing yards and 150.2 passing yards per game. The individual statistical leaders included quarterback George Mihaiu with 367 passing yards, halfback David Brown with 575 rushing yards, and tight end Billy Joe DuPree with 23 receptions and 406 receiving yards.

Five Spartans were selected by either the Associated Press (AP) or the United Press International (UPI) as first-team players on the 1972 All-Big Ten Conference football team: tight end Billy Joe Dupree (AP-2, UPI-1); offensive guard Joe DeLamielleure (AP-1, UPI-1); linebacker Gail Clark (AP-1, UPI-1); and defensive backs Bill Simpson (AP-1, UPI-1) and Brad Van Pelt (AP-1, UPI-1). Gail Clark was selected as the team's most valuable player.

On November 3, 1972, Duffy Daugherty announced that he would resign as Michigan State's head football coach at the end of the 1972 season. In 19 years as the head coach, he compiled a 109–69–5 record and won two Big Ten championships. Denny Stolz, who had been the Spartans' defensive coordinator for two years, was hired in December 1972 to replace Daugherty.

The team played its home games at Spartan Stadium in East Lansing, Michigan.

== Schedule ==
Date	Opponent	Rank	Site	Result	Attendance	Source
September 16	at Illinois		Memorial Stadium; Champaign, IL	W 24–0	55,493	
September 23	Georgia Tech*	No. 18	Spartan Stadium; East Lansing, MI	L 16–21	77,141	
September 30	at No. 1 USC*		Los Angeles Memorial Coliseum; Los Angeles, CA	L 6–51	63,934	
October 7	No. 7 Notre Dame*		Spartan Stadium; East Lansing, MI (rivalry)	L 0–16	77,828	
October 14	at No. 5 Michigan		Michigan Stadium; Ann Arbor, MI (rivalry)	L 0–10	103,735	
October 21	Wisconsin^{†}		Spartan Stadium; East Lansing, MI	W 31–0	62,638	
October 28	at Iowa		Kinnick Stadium; Iowa City, IA	T 6–6	46,852	
November 4	Purdue		Spartan Stadium; East Lansing, MI	W 22–12	58,649	
November 11	No. 5 Ohio State		Spartan Stadium; East Lansing, MI	W 19–12	76,264	
November 18	at Minnesota		Memorial Stadium; Minneapolis, MN	L 10–14	33,001	
November 25	Northwestern		Spartan Stadium; East Lansing, MI	W 24–14	46,140	
*Non-conference game; ^{†}Homecoming; Rankings from AP Poll released prior to the game

== Game summaries ==
=== Michigan ===
Team	1	2	3	4	Total
Michigan St	0	0	0	0	0
• Michigan	0	3	0	7	10

- Date: October 14
- Location: Michigan Stadium
- Game attendance: 103,735

Scoring summary
2	MICH	Lantry 22-yard field goal	Michigan 3-0
4	MICH	Chapman 58-yard run (Lantry kick)	Michigan 10-0

On October 14, 1972, Michigan State lost to Michigan, 10–0, in front of a crowd of 103,735 at Michigan Stadium. The game was Michigan's first shutout victory over Michigan State since 1947. Michigan scored on a 22-yard field goal by Mike Lantry in the second quarter and a 58-yard touchdown run by Gil Chapman in the fourth quarter. The Wolverines totaled 334 rushing yards, including 107 by Ed Shuttlesworth, 81 by Chuck Heater, and 64 by Dennis Franklin. The Spartans had a 24-yard touchdown run called back due to a clipping penalty, and their only other scoring threat ended when a hit from Dave Brown forced the Spartans' ball carrier to fumble into the end zone.
