= 1972 Ohio State Buckeyes football team =

American college football season

1972 Ohio State Buckeyes football
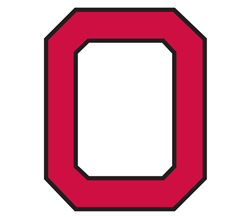

Big Ten co-champion

Rose Bowl, L 17–42 vs. USC
- Conference: Big Ten Conference

Ranking
- Coaches: No. 3
- AP: No. 9
- Record: 9–2 (7–1 Big Ten)
- Head coach: Woody Hayes (22nd season)
- Defensive coordinator: George Hill (2nd season)
- MVP: George Hasenohrl
- Captains: Richard Galbos; George Hasenohrl
- Home stadium: Ohio Stadium

1972 Big Ten Conference football standings
	Conf.					Overall
Team	W		L		T	W		L		T
No. 6 Michigan +	7	–	1	–	0	10	–	1	–	0
No. 9 Ohio State +	7	–	1	–	0	9	–	2	–	0
Purdue	6	–	2	–	0	6	–	5	–	0
Michigan State	5	–	2	–	1	5	–	5	–	1
Minnesota	4	–	4	–	0	4	–	7	–	0
Indiana	3	–	5	–	0	5	–	6	–	0
Illinois	3	–	5	–	0	3	–	8	–	0
Iowa	2	–	6	–	1	3	–	7	–	1
Wisconsin	2	–	6	–	0	4	–	7	–	0
Northwestern	1	–	8	–	0	2	–	9	–	0
+ – Conference co-champions; Rankings from AP Poll

The 1972 Ohio State Buckeyes football team was an represented the Ohio State University in the 1972 Big Ten Conference football season. Led by 22nd-year head coach Woody Hayes, the Buckeyes compiled an overall record of 9–2 with a mark of 7–1 in conference play, sharing the Big Ten title with Michigan. By virtue of a head-to-head win over Michigan, Ohio State earned a berth in the Rose Bowl, where the Buckeyes lost to USC by a score of 42–17. The team played home games at Ohio Stadium in Columbus, Ohio.

== Schedule ==
Date	Time	Opponent	Rank	Site	TV	Result	Attendance	Source
September 16	1:30 p.m.	Iowa	No. 3	Ohio Stadium; Columbus, OH		W 21–0	77,098	
September 30	1:30 p.m.	North Carolina*	No. 5	Ohio Stadium; Columbus, OH		W 29–14	86,180	
October 7	4:31 p.m.	at California*	No. 3	California Memorial Stadium; Berkeley, CA		W 35–18	45,000	
October 14	1:30 p.m.	Illinois	No. 4	Ohio Stadium; Columbus, OH (Illibuck)		W 26–7	86,298	
October 21	1:30 p.m.	Indiana	No. 4	Ohio Stadium; Columbus, OH		W 44–7	86,365	
October 28	2:30 p.m.	at Wisconsin	No. 4	Camp Randall Stadium; Madison, WI		W 28–20	78,713	
November 4	1:30 p.m.	Minnesota	No. 5	Ohio Stadium; Columbus, OH		W 27–19	86,439	
November 11	1:00 p.m.	at Michigan State	No. 5	Spartan Stadium; East Lansing, MI	ABC	L 12–19	76,264	
November 18	2:00 p.m.	at Northwestern	No. 9	Dyche Stadium; Evanston, IL		W 27–14	34,475	
November 25	1:00 p.m.	No. 3 Michigan	No. 9	Ohio Stadium; Columbus, OH (rivalry)	ABC	W 14–11	87,040	
January 1, 1973	4:45 p.m.	vs. No. 1 USC*	No. 3	Rose Bowl; Pasadena, CA (Rose Bowl)	NBC	L 17–42	106,869	
*Non-conference game; Rankings from AP Poll released prior to the game; All times are in Eastern time

== Rankings ==
Ranking movements Legend: ██ Increase in ranking ██ Decrease in ranking ( ) = First-place votes
	Week														
Poll	Pre	1	2	3	4	5	6	7	8	9	10	11	12	13	Final
AP	3 (4)	3 (5)	4 (2)	5 (1)	3	4 (1)	4 (1)	4 (1)	5 (1)	5 (1)	9	9	4	3	9
Coaches	4 (2)	4 (4)	5 (2)	6 (1)	4 (1)	4	5	3	4	4	9	8	4	3	Not released

== Game summaries ==
=== Iowa ===
Team	1	2	3	4	Total
Iowa	0	0	0	0	0
• Ohio St	0	7	7	7	21

- Date: September 16
- Location: Ohio Stadium, Columbus, Ohio
- Game start: 1:31p.m. EST
- Elapsed time: 2:21
- Game attendance: 77,098
- Game weather: Clear, 74 °F (23 °C)

Scoring summary
Q2	4:06	Ohio St	Keith 1 yard run (Conway kick)	Ohio St 7-0
Q3	0:26	Ohio St	Henson 4 yard run (Conway kick)	Ohio St 14-0
Q4	10:04	Ohio St	Henson 1 yard run (Conway kick)	Ohio St 21-0

=== North Carolina ===
North Carolina Tar Heels at Ohio State Buckeyes

Quarter	1	2	3	4	Total
North Carolina	7	0	0	7	14
Ohio St	3	6	14	6	29

at Ohio Stadium, Columbus, Ohio

- Date: September 30, 1972
- Game time: 1:30 p.m.
- Game weather: Cloudy, 49 °F (9 °C)
- Game attendance: 86,180

Game information

First quarter

- UNC – Gene Brown recovered blocked punt in end zone (Ellis Alexander kick), 9:37. North Carolina 7–0.
- OSU – Blair Conway 22-yard field goal, 0:06. North Carolina 7–3. Drive: 73 yards.

Second quarter

- OSU – Greg Hare 17-yard run (kick failed), 11:50. Ohio St 9–7. Drive: 47 yards.

Third quarter

- OSU – Randal Keith 11-yard run (Blair Conway kick), 8:41. Ohio St 16–7. Drive: 87 yards.
- OSU – Champ Henson 9-yard run (Blair Conway kick), 2:00. Ohio St 23–7. Drive: 84 yards.

Fourth quarter

- OSU – Archie Griffin 9-yard run (Blair Conway kick), 4:13. Ohio St 30–7. Drive: 31 yards.
- UNC – Earle Bethea 37-yard pass from Nick Vidnovic (Ellis Alexander), 0:00. Ohio St 30–14. Drive: 1 play, 37 yards, 0:05.

Top passers

- UNC – Nick Vidnovic – 4/14, 65 yards, TD, 2 INT
- OSU – Greg Hare – 5/12, 96 yards, INT

Top rushers

- UNC – Ike Oglesby – 14 rushes, 67 yards
- OSU – Archie Griffin – 27 rushes, 239 yards, TD

Top receivers

- UNC – Earle Bethea – 1 reception, 37 yards, TD
- OSU – Richard Galbos – 3 receptions, 72 yards

Ohio State was the only team to beat the Tar Heels in 1972.

Archie Griffin set the school single game rushing record in just his second game.

=== California ===
Team	1	2	3	4	Total
• Ohio St	3	0	19	13	35
California	0	9	3	6	18

- Date: October 7
- Location: California Memorial Stadium, Berkeley, California
- Game start: 1:31p.m. PST
- Elapsed time: 2:44
- Game attendance: 45,000
- Game weather: Cloudy, warm

Scoring summary
Q1	9:16	OSU	Conway 39-yard field goal	OSU 3-0
Q2	9:50	CAL	Safety, Toews blocked punt out of end zone	OSU 3-2
Q2	7:15	CAL	Sweeney 19-yard pass from Shaughnessy (Wersching kick)	CAL 9-3
Q3	14:08	OSU	Henson 25-yard run (kick failed)	Tied 9-9
Q3	6:47	CAL	Wersching 20-yard field goal	CAL 12-9
Q3	4:03	OSU	Henson 1-yard run (kick blocked)	OSU 15-12
Q3	1:02	OSU	Henson 1-yard run (Conway kick)	OSU 22-12
Q4	8:09	OSU	Datvos 22-yard run (kick failed)	OSU 28-12
Q4	2:35	OSU	Bartoszcek 5-yard pass from Purdy (Conway kick)	OSU 35-12
Q4	0:00	CAL	Shaughnessy 7-yard pass from Ferragamo (run failed)	OSU 35-18

=== Illinois ===
Team	1	2	3	4	Total
Illinois	0	7	0	0	7
• Ohio St	13	6	0	7	26

- Date: October 14
- Location: Ohio Stadium, Columbus, Ohio
- Game start: 1:33p.m. EST
- Elapsed time: 2:29
- Game attendance: 86,298
- Game weather: Cloudy, 59 °F (15 °C)

Scoring summary
Q1	OHST	Henson 5-yard run (Conway kick)	Ohio St 7-0
Q1	OHST	Henson 1-yard run (kick failed)	Ohio St 13-0
Q2	ILL	Lewis 60-yard pass from Perrin (Wells kick)	Ohio St 13-7
Q2	OHST	Henson 1-yard run (kick failed)	Ohio St 19-7
Q4	OHST	Pagac 10-yard pass from Purdy (Kleban kick)	Ohio St 26-7

=== Indiana ===
Team	1	2	3	4	Total
Indiana	0	7	0	0	7
• Ohio St	14	3	14	13	44

- Date: October 21
- Location: Ohio Stadium • Columbus, Ohio
- Game start: 1:32p.m. EST
- Elapsed time: 2:18
- Game attendance: 86,365
- Game weather: Cloudy, 51 °F (11 °C)

Scoring summary
Q1	5:57	OHST	Hare 7-yard run (kick failed)	Ohio St 6-0
Q1	4:40	OHST	Henson 1-yard run (Bradshaw pass from Hare)	Ohio St 14-0
Q2	9:51	IND	Flanagan 33-yard pass from Harris (Gartner kick)	Ohio St 14-7
Q2	3:35	OHST	Conway 32-yard field goal	Ohio St 17-7
Q3	12:45	OHST	Henson 23-yard run (Conway kick)	Ohio St 24-7
Q3	7:30	OHST	Hare 6-yard run (Conway kick)	Ohio St 31-7
Q4	13:55	OHST	Keith 1-yard run (run failed)	Ohio St 37-7
Q4	7:16	OHST	Morrison 1-yard run (Conway kick)	Ohio St 44-7

=== Wisconsin ===
Team	1	2	3	4	Total
• Ohio St	14	14	0	0	28
Wisconsin	0	7	7	6	20

- Date: October 28
- Location: Camp Randall Stadium, Madison, Wisconsin
- Game start: 1:31p.m. CST
- Elapsed time: 2:36
- Game attendance: 78,713
- Game weather: Mostly cloudy, 12 mph (19 km/h) wind, 47 °F (8 °C)

Scoring summary
Q1	12:15	OHST	Galbos 37 yard pass from Hare (Conway kick)	Ohio St 7–0
Q1	5:36	OHST	Henson 1 yard run (Conway kick)	Ohio St 14–0
Q2	9:27	OHST	Henson 1 yard run (Conway kick)	Ohio St 21–0
Q2	4:22	WIS	Novak 12 yard pass from Steiner (Barrios kick)	Ohio St 21–7
Q2	0:47	OHST	Hare 8 yard run (Conway kick)	Ohio St 28–7
Q3	9:48	WIS	Novak 15 yard pass from Steiner (Barrios kick)	Ohio St 28–14
Q4	1:52	WIS	Steiner 1 yard run (pass failed)	Ohio St 28–20

=== Minnesota ===
Team	1	2	3	4	Total
Minnesota	13	0	0	6	19
• Ohio State	7	14	0	6	27

- Date: November 4
- Location: Ohio Stadium
- Game start: 1:31p.m. EST
- Elapsed time: 2:17
- Game attendance: 86,439
- Game weather: Cloudy, 49 °F (9 °C)

Scoring summary
Q1	9:42	OSU	Henson 2 yard run (Conway kick)	OSU 7–0
Q1	8:22	MINN	Beaudoin 7 yard run (Goldberg kick)	TIED 7–7
Q1	1:02	MINN	King 1 yard run (pass failed)	MINN 7–13
Q2	13:05	OSU	Henson 16 yard run (Conway kick)	OSU 14–13
Q2	1:25	OSU	Griffin 11 yard run (Conway kick)	OSU 21–13
Q4	13:58	OSU	Hare 23 yard pass to Powell (kick failed)	OSU 27–13
Q4	3:08	MINN	Morgan 6 yard pass to King (pass failed)	OSU 27–19

=== Michigan State ===
Team	1	2	3	4	Total
Ohio State	3	9	0	0	12
• Michigan State	6	6	7	0	19

- Date: November 11
- Location: Spartan Stadium, East Lansing, Michigan
- Game start: 1:00p.m. EST
- Elapsed time: 2:45
- Game attendance: 76,264
- Game weather: Cloudy, WNW wind 10 mph (16 km/h), 41 °F (5 °C)

Scoring summary
Q1	11:24	MSU	Krijt 24 yard field goal	MSU 3–0
Q1	6:03	MSU	Krijt 40 field goal	MSU 6–0
Q1	3:27	OSU	Conway 44 yard field goal	MSU 6–3
Q2	14:02	OSU	Hare 20 yard pass to Powell (Conway kick)	OSU 6–10
Q2	11:52	OSU	Safety, blocked kick	OSU 6–12
Q2	1:03	MSU	Krijt 22 yard field goal	OSU 9–12
Q2	0:04	MSU	Krijt 31 yard field goal	TIED 12–12
Q3	7:20	MSU	Niesen 6 yard run (Krijt kick)	MSU 19–12

=== Northwestern ===
Team	1	2	3	4	Total
• Ohio State	7	0	13	7	27
Northwestern	0	7	7	0	14

- Date: November 18
- Location: Dyche Stadium, Evanston, Illinois
- Game start: 1:00p.m. CST
- Elapsed time: 2:29
- Game attendance: 34,475
- Game weather: Cloudy, cold

Scoring summary
Q1	5:03	OHST	Henson 1 yard run (Conway kick)	OHST 0–7
Q2	6:50	NW	Anderson 16 yard pass from Somers (Skarin kick)	TIED 7–7
Q3	11:17	OHST	Henson 1 yard run (Conway kick)	OHST 7–14
Q3	3:03	OHST	Henson 3 yard run (kick failed)	OHST 7–20
Q3	0:02	NW	Craig 10 yard pass from Anderson (Skarin kick)	OHST 14–20
Q4	0:21	OHST	Henson 3 yard run (Conway kick)	OHST 14–27

=== Michigan ===
Michigan Wolverines at Ohio State Buckeyes

Quarter	1	2	3	4	Total
Michigan	0	3	8	0	11
Ohio St	0	7	7	0	14

at Ohio Stadium, Columbus, Ohio

- Date: November 25, 1972
- Game time: 1:30 p.m.
- Game weather: Rain, 39 °F (4 °C)
- Game attendance: 87,040
- Referee: Ross Dean (Big Ten)
- TV announcers (ABC): Chris Schenkel, Bud Wilkinson

Game information

Second quarter

- MICH – Mike Lantry 35-yard field goal, 14:13. Michigan 3–0. Drive: 5 plays, 43 yards, 1:36.
- OSU – Champ Henson 1-yard run (Blair Conway kick), 4:30. Ohio St 7–3. Drive: 8 plays, 46 yards, 3:44.

Third quarter

- OSU – Archie Griffin 30-yard run (Blair Conway kick), 12:32. Ohio St 14–3. Drive: 6 plays, 78 yards, 2:18.
- MICH – Ed Shuttlesworth 1-yard run (pass good), 4:48. Ohio St 14–11. Drive: 13 plays, 58 yards, 7:35.

Top passers

- MICH – Dennis Franklin – 13/23, 160 yards
- OSU – Greg Hare – 1/3, 17 yards, INT

Top rushers

- MICH – Chuck Heater – 14 rushes, 65 yards
- OSU – Archie Griffin – 17 rushes, 75 yards, TD

Top receivers

- MICH – Paul Seal – 4 receptions, 60 yards
- OSU – Archie Griffin – 1 reception, 17 yards

Ohio State made two goal line stands, one in each half, to hold on to the 14–11 victory. The first came just before halftime as Dennis Franklin fumbled on fourth down at the two. In the fourth quarter, Randy Gradishar stopped Franklin on a sneak from the one. The Buckeyes' fans tore down the goal posts with 13 seconds remaining.

=== Vs. No. 1 USC (Rose Bowl) ===
Team	1	2	3	4	Total
No. 3 Buckeyes	0	7	3	7	17
• No. 1 Trojans	7	0	21	14	42

- Date: January 1, 1973
- Location: Rose Bowl, Pasadena, California
- Game start: 2:00p.m. PST
- Game attendance: 106,869
- TV announcers (NBC): Curt Gowdy, Al DeRogatis

Scoring summary
Q1	1:30	USC	Rae 10 yard pass to Swann (Rae kick)	USC 7–0
Q2	13:37	OSU	Keith 1 yard run (Conway kick)	TIED 7–7
Q3	12:18	USC	Cunningham 2 yard run (Rae kick)	USC 14–7
Q3	8:11	OSU	Conway 21 yard field goal	USC 14–10
Q3	5:51	USC	Davis 20 yard run (Rae kick)	USC 21–10
Q3	1:25	USC	Cunningham 1 yard run (Rae kick)	USC 28–10
Q4	9:10	USC	Cunningham 1 yard run (Rae kick)	USC 35–10
Q4	5:13	USC	Cunningham 1 yard run (Rae kick)	USC 42–10
Q4	0:34	OSU	Bledsoe 5 yard run (Conway kick)	USC 42–17

== Personnel ==
=== Coaching staff ===
- Woody Hayes – head coach (22nd year)
- George Chaump – offense (5th year)
- George Hill – defensive coordinator (2nd year)
- Rudy Hubbard – running backs (5th year)
- Charles Clausen – defense line (2nd year)
- Edward Ferkany – offensive line / punter (1st year)
- Rudy Hubbard – running backs (5th year)
- John Mummey – quarterbacks (4th year)
- Ralph Staub – tackles / tight ends / kickers (3rd year)
- Dick Walker – defensive backs (4th year)

=== Depth chart ===
Defense

FS
Rick Seifert
Rich Parsons

WLB	MLB	SLB
Rick Middleton	Arnie Jones	Randy Gradishar
⋅	Vic Koegel	⋅

SS
Lou Mathis
Doug Plank

CB
Neal Colzie
Tim Fox

DE	DT	DT	DE
Van DeCree	Pete Cusick	George Hasenhorl	Jim Cope
Mike Scannell	Shad Williams	⋅	Tom Marendt

CB
Jeff Davis
John Hughes

Offense

SE
Mike Bartoszek
Morris Bradshaw

LT	LG	C	RG	RT
Merv Teague	Jim Kregel	Steve Myers	Charles Bonica	John Hicks
Doug France	⋅	Steve Luke	Larry Wiggins	⋅

TE
Fred Pagac
Ted Powell

WB
Brian Baschnagel
Rich Galbos

QB
Greg Hare
Steve Morrison

FB
Champ Henson
Randy Keith

Special teams
PK Blair Conway
P Gary Lago

PR Neal Colzie

RB
Archie Griffin
Elmer Lippert

== NFL draft picks ==
Player	Round	Pick	Position	NFL club
Rick Seifert	8	194	Defensive back	New York Jets
George Hasenohrl	8	198	Defensive tackle	New York Giants
John Bledsoe	8	203	Running back	Detroit Lions
Rich Galbos	9	218	Running back	Washington Redskins
Earl Belgrave	17	435	Tackle	Detroit Lions
