= 1972 Purdue Boilermakers football team =

American college football season

1972 Purdue Boilermakers football
- Conference: Big Ten Conference
- Record: 6–5 (6–2 Big Ten)
- Head coach: Bob DeMoss (3rd season)
- MVP: Otis Armstrong
- Captains: Otis Armstrong; Dave Butz
- Home stadium: Ross–Ade Stadium

1972 Big Ten Conference football standings
	Conf.					Overall
Team	W		L		T	W		L		T
No. 6 Michigan +	7	–	1	–	0	10	–	1	–	0
No. 9 Ohio State +	7	–	1	–	0	9	–	2	–	0
Purdue	6	–	2	–	0	6	–	5	–	0
Michigan State	5	–	2	–	1	5	–	5	–	1
Minnesota	4	–	4	–	0	4	–	7	–	0
Indiana	3	–	5	–	0	5	–	6	–	0
Illinois	3	–	5	–	0	3	–	8	–	0
Iowa	2	–	6	–	1	3	–	7	–	1
Wisconsin	2	–	6	–	0	4	–	7	–	0
Northwestern	1	–	8	–	0	2	–	9	–	0
+ – Conference co-champions; Rankings from AP Poll

The 1972 Purdue Boilermakers football team represented Purdue University during the 1972 Big Ten Conference football season. Led by Bob DeMoss in his third and final season as head coach, the Boilermakers compiled an overall record of 6–5 with a mark of 6–2 in conference play, placing third in the Big Ten. Purdue played home games at Ross–Ade Stadium in West Lafayette, Indiana.

This was the first season in which Purdue played an 11-game schedule. Every Big Ten team except the Boilermakers and Ohio State added an 11th game for the first time in 1971. The Buckeyes did not play an 11-game slate until 1974.

== Schedule ==
Date	Time	Opponent	Rank	Site	Result	Attendance	Source
September 16	1:30 p.m.	Bowling Green*	No. 18	Ross–Ade Stadium; West Lafayette, IN	L 14–17	51,859	
September 23		No. 15 Washington*		Ross–Ade Stadium; West Lafayette, IN	L 21–22	60,102	
September 30		at No. 10 Notre Dame*		Notre Dame Stadium; Notre Dame, IN (rivalry)	L 14–35	59,075	
October 7		at Iowa		Kinnick Stadium; Iowa City, IA	W 24–0	54,576	
October 14		at Minnesota		Memorial Stadium; Minneapolis, MN	W 28–3	37,287	
October 21		Northwestern^{†}		Ross–Ade Stadium; West Lafayette, IN	W 37–0	63,049	
October 28		Illinois		Ross–Ade Stadium; West Lafayette, IN (rivalry)	W 20–14	61,784	
November 4		at Michigan State		Spartan Stadium; East Lansing, MI	L 12–22	58,649	
November 11		Wisconsin		Ross–Ade Stadium; West Lafayette, IN	W 27–6	53,507	
November 18		at No. 3 Michigan		Michigan Stadium; Ann Arbor, MI	L 6–9	88,423	
November 25		Indiana		Ross–Ade Stadium; West Lafayette, IN (Old Oaken Bucket)	W 42–7	65,065	
*Non-conference game; ^{†}Homecoming; Rankings from AP Poll released prior to the game; All times are in Eastern time

== Game summaries ==
=== Washington ===
- Gary Danielson 16 rushes, 213 yards

=== At Minnesota ===
Team	1	2	3	4	Total
• Purdue	0	7	14	7	28
Minnesota	0	3	0	0	3

- Date: October 14
- Location: Memorial Stadium • Minneapolis, Minnesota
- Game attendance: 37,287

Scoring summary
2	PUR	Armstrong 5-yard run (Bobrowski kick)	Purdue 7-3
2	MINN	Golberg 25-yard field goal	Purdue 7-3
3	PUR	Armstrong 97-yard kickoff return (Bobrowski kick)	Purdue 14-3
3	PUR	Carter 45-yard fumble return (Bobrowski kick)	Purdue 21-3
4	PUR	Bobrowski 4-yard run (Bobrowski kick)	Purdue 28-3

- Otis Armstrong 25 rushes, 152 yards

=== Northwestern ===
- Otis Armstrong 32 rushes, 233 yards

=== Wisconsin ===
- Otis Armstrong 19 rushes, 169 yards

=== Indiana ===
Team	1	2	3	4	Total
Indiana	0	7	0	0	7
• Purdue	7	7	7	21	42

- Date: November 25
- Location: Ross–Ade Stadium, West Lafayette, IN
- Game attendance: 65,065

Scoring summary
1	PUR	Otis Armstrong 2-yard run (Frank Conner kick)	PUR 7-0
2	PUR	Darryl Stingley 79-yard pass from Gary Danielson (Frank Conner kick)	PUR 14-0
2	IND	Dennis Cremeens 2-yard run (Sven Chris Gartner kick)	PUR 14-7
3	PUR	Otis Armstrong 71-yard run (Frank Conner kick)	PUR 21-7
4	PUR	Gary Danielson 5-yard run (Frank Conner kick)	PUR 28-7
4	PUR	Otis Armstrong 53-yard run (Frank Conner kick)	PUR 35-7
4	PUR	Bo Bobrowski 5-yard run (Frank Conner kick)	PUR 42-7

Otis Armstrong carried 32 times for 276 yards, breaking his own single-game school rushing record (233) and passing Wisconsin's Alan Ameche for most career rushing yards in the Big Ten with 3,316.

== Roster ==
1972 Purdue Boilermakers football team roster
Players
Coaches
Offense

Pos.	#	Name	Class
OL		Mike Albright
RB		Otis Armstrong
QB		Bo Bobrowski
QB	18	Gary Danielson	Sr
OL		Frank DiLieto
RB		Bob Herrick
TE		Gary Hrivnak
RB		Roy Kidd
OL		Don Myers
OL		Rich Ostriker
RB		Bill Pedhoretzky
OL		Ralph Perretta
RB		Skip Peterson
WR		Dane Roman
TE		Barry Santini
WR		Rick Sayers
OL		Steve Schaefer
OL		Donn Smith
RB		Jack Spellman
RB		Darryl Stingley

Defense

Pos.	#	Name	Class
DL		Mike Barr
DL		Steve Baumgartner
DL		Gregg Bingham
DL		Dave Butz
DB		Carl Capria
DB		Arnold Carter
DB		Fred Cooper
LB		Mark Gefert
DL		Bronco Keser
DB		Bill Knox
LB		Joe Monago
LB		Ron North
DB		Chuck Piebes
DB		Tim Racke
DL		Joe Tenkman

Special teams

Pos.	#	Name	Class

Head coach

- Bob DeMoss

Coordinators/assistant coaches

- George Catavolos
- Ned Maloney
- Tony Mason
- Tom Roggeman

Legend

- (C) Team captain
- (S) Suspended
- (I) Ineligible
- Injured
- Redshirt
