= 1972 Northwestern Wildcats football team =

American college football season

1972 Northwestern Wildcats football
- Conference: Big Ten Conference
- Record: 2–9 (1–8 Big Ten)
- Head coach: Alex Agase (9th season)
- Captains: Jim Anderson; Dave Dybas; Dave Glantz; Jim Lash
- Home stadium: Dyche Stadium

1972 Big Ten Conference football standings
	Conf.					Overall
Team	W		L		T	W		L		T
No. 6 Michigan +	7	–	1	–	0	10	–	1	–	0
No. 9 Ohio State +	7	–	1	–	0	9	–	2	–	0
Purdue	6	–	2	–	0	6	–	5	–	0
Michigan State	5	–	2	–	1	5	–	5	–	1
Minnesota	4	–	4	–	0	4	–	7	–	0
Indiana	3	–	5	–	0	5	–	6	–	0
Illinois	3	–	5	–	0	3	–	8	–	0
Iowa	2	–	6	–	1	3	–	7	–	1
Wisconsin	2	–	6	–	0	4	–	7	–	0
Northwestern	1	–	8	–	0	2	–	9	–	0
+ – Conference co-champions; Rankings from AP Poll

Wisconsin vs. Northwestern game in October 1972

The 1972 Northwestern Wildcats team represented Northwestern University during the 1972 Big Ten Conference football season. In their ninth and final year under head coach Alex Agase, the Wildcats compiled a 2–9 record (1–8 against Big Ten Conference opponents) and finished in last place in the Big Ten Conference.

The team's offensive leaders were quarterback Mitch Anderson with 1,335 passing yards, Greg Boykin with 625 rushing yards, and Jim Lash with 667 receiving yards. Five Northwestern player received All-Big Ten honors. They are: (1) tight end Steve Craig (AP-1, UPI-1); (2) split end Jim Lash (UPI-1); (3) defensive back Greg Strunk (AP-2, UPI-2); (4) defensive lineman Jim Anderson (AP-2); and (5) running back Greg Boykin (AP-2).

This was the first of 23 consecutive losing seasons for the Wildcats.

== Schedule ==
Date	Opponent	Site	Result	Attendance	Source
September 16	at No. 11 Michigan	Michigan Stadium; Ann Arbor, MI (rivalry)	L 0–7	71,757	
September 23	No. 13 Notre Dame*	Dyche Stadium; Evanston, IL (rivalry)	L 0–37	55,155	
September 30	at Pittsburgh*	Pitt Stadium; Pittsburgh, PA	W 27–22	18,557	
October 7	at Wisconsin	Camp Randall Stadium; Madison, WI	L 14–21	74,595	
October 14	Iowa	Dyche Stadium; Evanston, IL	L 12–23	31,149	
October 21	at Purdue	Ross–Ade Stadium; West Lafayette, IN	L 0–37	63,049	
October 28	Indiana	Dyche Stadium; Evanston, IL	W 23–14	32,007	
November 4	Illinois	Dyche Stadium; Evanston, IL (rivalry)	L 13–43	35,235	
November 11	at Minnesota	Memorial Stadium; Minneapolis, MN	L 29–35	33,001	
November 18	No. 9 Ohio State	Dyche Stadium; Evanston, IL	L 14–27	34,475	
November 25	at Michigan State	Spartan Stadium; East Lansing, MI	L 14–24	46,140	
*Non-conference game; Rankings from AP Poll released prior to the game

== Roster ==
1972 Northwestern Wildcats football team roster
Players
Coaches
Offense

Pos.	#	Name	Class
QB	12	Mitch Anderson	So
TE	84	Steve Craig	Jr
OT	75	Dave Glantz (C)	Sr
WR	28	Steve Harris	Jr
G	64	Donnie Haynes	Jr
G	68	Paul Hiemenz	So
WR	86	Jim Lash (C)	Sr
C	57	Larry Lilja	So
OT	63	Larry Mishler	Sr
FB	34	Harold Smith	Jr
WR	88	Rick Sund	Sr
FB	39	Jim Trimble	So

Defense

Pos.	#	Name	Class
DT	74	Jim Anderson (C)	Sr
LB	38	Steve Anenen	Jr
LB	43	Doug Belko	So
LB	98	Rob Mason	So
LB	82	Pat McNamara	Sr
LB	33	Carl Patrnchak	So
LB	32	Joe Patrnchak	So
DT	56	George Petrak	Jr
DE	53	Dale Spriet	So
DB	18	Greg Strunk	Sr
DB	15	Greg Swanson	Jr
LB	66	Mike Varty	Jr
DT	97	Joe Verzino	Sr

Special teams

Pos.	#	Name	Class
P	23	Marty McGann	Sr

Head coach

- Alex Agase

Coordinators/assistant coaches

- Ron Marciniak – Offensive line

Legend

- (C) Team captain
- (S) Suspended
- (I) Ineligible
- Injured
- Redshirt
