= 1972 Wisconsin Badgers football team =

American college football season

1972 Wisconsin Badgers football
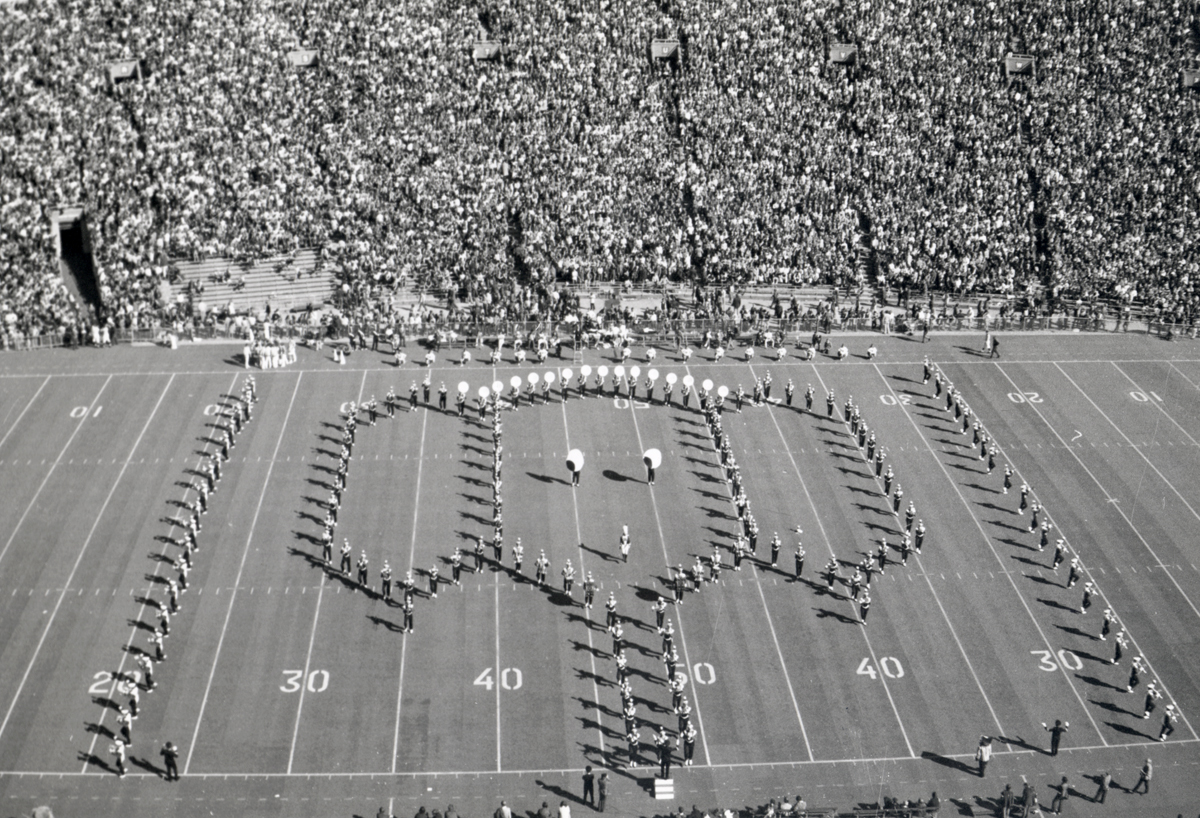
- UW Band forms an elephant at halftime of the Northwestern game
- Conference: Big Ten Conference
- Record: 4–7 (2–6 Big Ten)
- Head coach: John Jardine (3rd season)
- Offensive coordinator: Larry Van Dusen (1st season)
- Defensive coordinator: Lew Stueck (3rd season)
- Base defense: 4–3
- MVP: Rufus Ferguson
- Captains: Dave Lokanc; Keith Nosbusch
- Home stadium: Camp Randall Stadium

1972 Big Ten Conference football standings
	Conf.					Overall
Team	W		L		T	W		L		T
No. 6 Michigan +	7	–	1	–	0	10	–	1	–	0
No. 9 Ohio State +	7	–	1	–	0	9	–	2	–	0
Purdue	6	–	2	–	0	6	–	5	–	0
Michigan State	5	–	2	–	1	5	–	5	–	1
Minnesota	4	–	4	–	0	4	–	7	–	0
Indiana	3	–	5	–	0	5	–	6	–	0
Illinois	3	–	5	–	0	3	–	8	–	0
Iowa	2	–	6	–	1	3	–	7	–	1
Wisconsin	2	–	6	–	0	4	–	7	–	0
Northwestern	1	–	8	–	0	2	–	9	–	0
+ – Conference co-champions; Rankings from AP Poll

The 1972 Wisconsin Badgers football team was an American football team that represented the University of Wisconsin as a member of the Big Ten Conference during the 1972 Big Ten season. In their third year under head coach John Jardine, the Badgers compiled a 4–7 record (2–6 in conference games), finished in ninth place in the Big Ten, and were outscored by a total of 229 to 152.

The Badgers gained an average of 117.5 passing yards and 200.0 rushing yards per game. On defense, they gave up an average of 102.3 passing yards and 249.6 rushing yards per game. The team's individual statistical leaders included: quarterback Rudy Steiner (1,080 passing yards); running back Rufus Ferguson (1,004 rushing yards); and running back Jeff Mack (27 receptions for 528 yards).

Dave Lokanc and Keith Nosbusch were the team captains. Rufus Ferguson was selected as the team's most valuable player. Four Wisconsin players received first- or second-team All-Big Ten honors from the Associated Press (AP) or United Press International (UPI): Ferguson at running back (AP-1, UPI-2); Lokanc at linebacker (AP-1, UPI-2); and Nosbusch at offensive guard (AP-2, UPI-2); and Mike Webster at center (UPI-2).

The Badgers played their home games at Camp Randall Stadium in Madison, Wisconsin.

== Schedule ==
Date	Time	Opponent	Site	Result	Attendance	Source
September 16	1:30 p.m.	Northern Illinois*	Camp Randall Stadium; Madison, WI	W 31–7	62,710	
September 23		Syracuse*	Camp Randall Stadium; Madison, WI	W 31–7	67,234	
September 30		at LSU*	Tiger Stadium; Baton Rouge, LA	L 7–27	69,142	
October 7		Northwestern	Camp Randal Stadium; Madison, WI	W 21–14	74,595	
October 14		at Indiana	Memorial Stadium; Bloomington, IN	L 7–33	50,122	
October 21		at Michigan State	Spartan Stadium; East Lansing, MI	L 0–31	62,638	
October 28		No. 4 Ohio State	Camp Randall Stadium; Madison, WI	L 20–28	78,713	
November 4		Iowa^{†}	Camp Randall Stadium; Madison, WI (rivalry)	W 16–14	78,723	
November 11		at Purdue	Ross–Ade Stadium; West Lafayette, IN	L 6–27	53,507	
November 18		at Illinois	Memorial Stadium; Champaign, IL	L 7–27	45,703	
November 25		Minnesota	Camp Randall Stadium; Madison, WI (rivalry)	L 6–14	60,746	
*Non-conference game; ^{†}Homecoming; Rankings from AP Poll released prior to the game; All times are in Central time

== Roster ==
1972 Wisconsin Badgers football team roster
Players
Coaches
Offense

Pos.	#	Name	Class
G	66	Mike Becker	Jr
QB	14	Gregg Bohlig	So
G	63	Bob Braun	Sr
RB	25	Tony Davis	So
RB	21	Rufus Ferguson	Sr
WR	84	Mike Haas	Sr
RB	22	Duane Johnson	Fr
OT	75	Bob Johnson	So
OT	70	Dennis Lick	Fr
TE	86	Tom Lonnborg	Sr
FB	30	Gary Lund	Sr
RB	39	Jeff Mack	So
OT	62	Keith Nosbusch (C)	Sr
TE	88	Jack Novak	So
C	53	John Pagel	Sr
C	52	Mike Passini	Sr
WR	87	Rod Rhodes	So
FB	23	Chuck Richardson	Sr
WR	45	Art Sanger	Jr
G	67	Dan Schroeder	Jr
QB	15	Rudy Steiner	Sr
C	51	Mike Webster	Jr

Defense

Pos.	#	Name	Class
LB	58	Ed Bosold	Jr
S	19	Chris Davis	Jr
S	46	Ron Buss	Sr
DE	69	Phil Connors	Sr
LB	35	Bob Hanssen	Jr
DT	54	Brian Harney	Jr
LB	56	John Hoffman	Jr
DT	70	Tom Koch	Sr
DT	60	Mark Levenhagen	Jr
LB	57	Dave Lokanc (C)	Sr
DT	79	Michael Mayer	Sr
DT	77	Angelo Messina	Jr
LB	59	Todd Nordwig	Jr
CB	24	Alvin Peabody	So
DB	28	Randy Safranek	Sr
LB	50	David Schrader	Sr
DT	74	Jim Schymanski	Jr
DE	81	Mike Seifert	Jr
DE	78	Bob Storck	Sr
CB	29	Jim Wesley	Jr
LB	47	Mark Zakula	So

Special teams

Pos.	#	Name	Class
K	7	Rich Barrios	Jr
P	41	Stan Williams	So

Head coach

- John Jardine

Coordinators/assistant coaches

- Larry Van Dusen – Offensive Coordinator/Offensive Backs
- Lew Stueck – Defensive Coordinator/Linebackers
- George Chryst – Junior Varsity Offensive Coach
- Norm Dow – Quarterbacks
- Jim Martin – Wide Receivers
- Charlie McBride – Offensive Line
- Dick Selcer – Defensive Backs
- Dick Teteak – Defensive Line
- LaVern Van Dyke – Administrative Assistant

Legend

- (C) Team captain
- (S) Suspended
- (I) Ineligible
- Injured
- Redshirt

== Players in the 1973 NFL draft ==
The following Wisconsin players were selected in the 1973 NFL draft.

Player	Position	Round	Pick	NFL club
Robert Storck	Defensive Tackle	12	297	Los Angeles Rams
Rufus Ferguson	Running Back	16	404	Atlanta Falcons
