= 1972 Illinois Fighting Illini football team =

American college football season

1972 Illinois Fighting Illini football
- Conference: Big Ten Conference
- Record: 3–8 (3–5 Big Ten)
- Head coach: Bob Blackman (2nd season)
- MVPs: Larry McCarren; Larry Allen
- Captains: Larry McCarren; John Wiza
- Home stadium: Memorial Stadium

1972 Big Ten Conference football standings
	Conf.					Overall
Team	W		L		T	W		L		T
No. 6 Michigan +	7	–	1	–	0	10	–	1	–	0
No. 9 Ohio State +	7	–	1	–	0	9	–	2	–	0
Purdue	6	–	2	–	0	6	–	5	–	0
Michigan State	5	–	2	–	1	5	–	5	–	1
Minnesota	4	–	4	–	0	4	–	7	–	0
Indiana	3	–	5	–	0	5	–	6	–	0
Illinois	3	–	5	–	0	3	–	8	–	0
Iowa	2	–	6	–	1	3	–	7	–	1
Wisconsin	2	–	6	–	0	4	–	7	–	0
Northwestern	1	–	8	–	0	2	–	9	–	0
+ – Conference co-champions; Rankings from AP Poll

The 1972 Illinois Fighting Illini football team was an American football team that represented the University of Illinois as a member of the Big Ten Conference during the 1972 Big Ten season. In their second year under head coach Bob Blackman, the Illini compiled a 3–8 record (3–5 in conference games), finished in a tie for sixth place in the Big Ten, and were outscored by a total of 277 to 197.

The team's statistical leaders included quarterback Mike Wells with 837 passing yards, running back George Uremovich with 611 rushing yards, and wide receiver Garvin Roberson with 569 receiving yards. Center Larry McCarren and defensive end Larry Allen were selected as the team's most valuable players. Wells and center Larry McCarren received first-team honors on the 1972 All-Big Ten Conference football team.

The team played its home games at Memorial Stadium in Champaign, Illinois.

== Schedule ==
Date	Opponent	Site	Result	Attendance	Source
September 16	Michigan State	Memorial Stadium; Champaign, IL	L 0–24	55,493	
September 23	No. 1 USC*	Memorial Stadium; Champaign, IL	L 20–55	61,227	
September 30	at No. 14 Washington*	Husky Stadium; Seattle, WA	L 11–31	61,200	
October 7	No. 16 Penn State*	Memorial Stadium; Champaign, IL	L 17–35	60,394	
October 14	at No. 4 Ohio State	Ohio Stadium; Columbus, OH (Illibuck)	L 7–26	86,298	
October 21	No. 6 Michigan	Memorial Stadium; Champaign, IL (rivalry)	L 7–31	64,290	
October 28	at Purdue	Ross–Ade Stadium; West Lafayette, IN (rivalry)	L 14–20	61,784	
November 4	at Northwestern	Dyche Stadium; Evanston, IL (rivalry)	W 43–13	35,235	
November 11	Indiana	Memorial Stadium; Champaign, IL (rivalry)	W 37–20	55,077	
November 18	Wisconsin	Memorial Stadium; Champaign, IL	W 27–7	45,703	
November 25	at Iowa	Kinnick Stadium; Iowa City, IA	L 14–15	25,000	
*Non-conference game; Rankings from AP Poll released prior to the game

== Roster ==
1972 Illinois Fighting Illini football team roster
Players
Coaches
Offense

Pos.	#	Name	Class
HB	22	Roger Coleman	So
OT	76	Mike Dobrzeniecki	Sr
OT	73	Bruce Dobson	Jr
TE	86	Bob Dubrish	Jr
HB, FB	32	Tom Feeheley	So
C	54	Larry McCarren	Sr
RB	33	Lonnie Perrin	So
OT	51	Gerry Sullivan	Jr
QB	12	Mike Wells	Sr

Defense

Pos.	#	Name	Class
DE	82	Mick Heinrich	Jr
LB	99	Tom Hicks	So
LB	55	John Wiza	Sr

Special teams

Pos.	#	Name	Class

Head coach

- Bob Blackman

Coordinators/assistant coaches

Legend

- (C) Team captain
- (S) Suspended
- (I) Ineligible
- Injured
- Redshirt

Roster
