= Bo Rather =

American football player (1950–2018)

No. 82, 80, 85
- Position: Wide receiver

Personal information
- Born: October 7, 1950; Sandusky, Ohio, U.S.
- Died: April 2, 2018 (aged 67); Battle Creek, Michigan, U.S.
- Listed height: 6 ft 1 in (1.85 m)
- Listed weight: 184 lb (83 kg)

Career information
- High school: Sandusky (OH)
- College: Michigan
- NFL draft: 1973: 4th round, 104th overall pick

Career history
- Miami Dolphins (1973); Chicago Bears (1974–1978); Miami Dolphins (1978)

Awards and highlights
- Super Bowl champion (VIII)

Career NFL statistics
- Receptions: 92
- Receiving yards: 1,467
- Receiving TDs: 7
- Stats at Pro Football Reference

David Elmer "Bo" Rather (October 7, 1950 – April 2, 2018) was an American professional football player. He played college football for the University of Michigan from 1970 to 1972 and as a wide receiver in the National Football League (NFL) for the Miami Dolphins in 1973 and 1978 and for the Chicago Bears from 1974 to 1978. In six years of playing in the NFL, Rather appeared in 64 games and had 92 receptions for 1,467 yards and seven touchdowns.

== Early life ==
Rather was born in Sandusky, Ohio, in 1950. He attended Sandusky High School.

== University of Michigan ==
Rather enrolled at the University of Michigan in 1969 and played college football for Bo Schembechler's Michigan Wolverines football teams from 1970 to 1972. As a sophomore in 1970, Rather was a defensive back who started two games for the Wolverines.

As a junior, Rather was moved to the offense where he started 11 games at the split end position for the 1971 Michigan Wolverines football team that compiled an 11-1 record, scored 421 points, and broke Michigan's all-time record with 3,977 net rushing yards (331 rushing yards per game). In September 1971, Rather led Michigan to a 21-6 victory over Northwestern with 114 all-purpose yards and a rushing touchdown. However, he played for a run-oriented offense, catching only 11 passes for 181 yards and two touchdowns.

As a senior, Rather started six games at split end for the 1972 Wolverines that compiled a 10-1 record. Rather shared playing time at the split end position with Gil Chapman. In September 1972, Rather caught a 21-yard touchdown pass from Dennis Franklin to give Michigan a 7-0 victory over Northwestern. During the 1972 season, Rather caught a total of 15 passes for 197 yards and two touchdowns.

Rather gained a total of 796 all-purpose yards for Michigan, including 378 receiving yards and 302 yards on kickoff returns.

== Professional football ==
Rather was selected by the Miami Dolphins in the fourth round (104th overall pick) of the 1973 NFL draft. He appeared in only six games for the Dolphins during the 1973 NFL season and had no pass receptions. He next played for the Chicago Bears as a wide receiver from 1974 to 1978. During his time with the Bears, Rather appeared in 55 games, 37 as a starter, and caught 91 passes for 1,428 yards and seven touchdowns. Rather returned to the Dolphins for the final three games of the 1979 NFL season.

In six years of playing in the NFL, Rather appeared in 64 games and had 92 receptions for 1,467 yards and seven touchdowns.
