= 1972 Iowa Hawkeyes football team =

American college football season

1972 Iowa Hawkeyes football
- Conference: Big Ten Conference
- Record: 3–7–1 (2–6–1 Big Ten)
- Head coach: Frank Lauterbur (2nd season)
- MVP: Dan Dickel
- Captains: Craig Darling; Dave Harris; Dave Simms
- Home stadium: Kinnick Stadium

1972 Big Ten Conference football standings
	Conf.					Overall
Team	W		L		T	W		L		T
No. 6 Michigan +	7	–	1	–	0	10	–	1	–	0
No. 9 Ohio State +	7	–	1	–	0	9	–	2	–	0
Purdue	6	–	2	–	0	6	–	5	–	0
Michigan State	5	–	2	–	1	5	–	5	–	1
Minnesota	4	–	4	–	0	4	–	7	–	0
Indiana	3	–	5	–	0	5	–	6	–	0
Illinois	3	–	5	–	0	3	–	8	–	0
Iowa	2	–	6	–	1	3	–	7	–	1
Wisconsin	2	–	6	–	0	4	–	7	–	0
Northwestern	1	–	8	–	0	2	–	9	–	0
+ – Conference co-champions; Rankings from AP Poll

The 1972 Iowa Hawkeyes football team was an American football team that represented the University of Iowa as a member of the Big Ten Conference during the 1972 Big Ten football season. In their second year under head coach Frank Lauterbur, the Hawkeyes compiled a 3–7–1 record (2–6–1 in conference game), finished in eighth place in the Big Ten, and were outscored by a total of 208 to 109.

The 1972 Hawkeyes gained 1,629 rushing yards and 825 passing yards. On defense, they gave up 2,724 rushing yards and 989 passing yards.

The team's statistical leaders included Kyle Skogman (24-of-57 passing for 356 yards), Dave Harris (621 rushing yards), Brian Rollins (29 receptions for 378 yards), and Harris and Frank Holmes (24 points each). Andre Jackson set a single-season Iowa record (still standing) with 171 total tackles in 1972. Harris, offensive lineman Craig Darling, and linebacker Dave Simms were the team captains. Defensive end Dan Dickel was also selected as the team's most valuable player.

Prior to the 1972 season, Iowa renamed Iowa Stadium as Kinnick Stadium in honor of 1939 Heisman Trophy winner Nile Kinnick. Artificial turf was also installed with a block "I" at the center of the field for the 1972 season. The stadium was called Iowa Stadium from its opening in 1929 through the 1971 season. Home attendance in 1972 totaled 220,833, an average of 44,166 per game.

== Schedule ==
Date	Opponent	Site	Result	Attendance	Source
September 16	at No. 3 Ohio State	Ohio Stadium; Columbus, OH	L 0–21	77,098	
September 23	Oregon State*	Kinnick Stadium; Iowa City, IA	W 19–11	51,229	
September 30	at No. 13 Penn State*	Beaver Stadium; University Park, PA	L 10–14	58,065	
October 7	Purdue	Kinnick Stadium; Iowa City, IA	L 0–24	54,576	
October 14	at Northwestern	Dyche Stadium; Evanston, IL	W 23–12	31,149	
October 21	at Minnesota	Memorial Stadium; Minneapolis, MN (rivalry)	L 14–43	44,196	
October 28	Michigan State^{†}	Kinnick Stadium; Iowa City, IA	T 6–6	46,852	
November 4	at Wisconsin	Camp Randall Stadium; Madison, WI (rivalry)	L 14–16	78,723	
November 11	No. 4 Michigan	Kinnick Stadium; Iowa City, IA	L 0–31	43,176	
November 18	at Indiana	Memorial Stadium; Bloomington, IN	L 8–16	27,440	
November 25	Illinois	Kinnick Stadium; Iowa City, IA	W 15–14	25,000	
*Non-conference game; ^{†}Homecoming; Rankings from AP Poll released prior to the game

== Game summaries ==
=== At No. 3 Ohio State ===
Iowa at No. 3 Ohio State

Team	1	2	3	4	Total
Hawkeyes	0	0	0	0	0
• No. 3 Buckeyes	0	7	7	7	21

- Date: September 16
- Location: Ohio Stadium, Columbus, Ohio
- Game start: 1:31p.m. EST
- Elapsed time: 2:21
- Game attendance: 77,098
- Game weather: Clear, 74 °F (23 °C)

Scoring summary
2	4:06	Ohio St	Keith 1-yard run (Conway kick)	Ohio St 7-0
3	0:26	Ohio St	Henson 4-yard run (Conway kick)	Ohio St 14-0
4	10:04	Ohio St	Henson 1-yard run (Conway kick)	Ohio St 21-0

=== Illinois ===
Team	1	2	3	4	Total
Fighting Illini	0	0	6	8	14
• Hawkeyes	0	7	0	8	15

- Date: November 25
- Location: Kinnick Stadium, Columbus, Ohio
- Game attendance: 25,000
- Game weather: Cloudy and misting, 34 °F (1 °C)
- Source: Box Score

Scoring summary
2	4:45	Iowa	Mix 92-yard run (Kokolus kick)	Iowa 7-0
3	4:52	Illini	Greene 4-yard run (kick failed)	Iowa 7-6
4	11:26	Illini	Perrin 2-yard run (Roberson pass from Wells)	Illinois 14-7
4	4:10	Iowa	Holmes 1-yard run (Caldwell run)	Iowa 15-14

Iowa closed the season with a win over Illinois. The Hawkeyes would not win again until upsetting No. 12 UCLA in the home opener of the 1974 season.

== Roster ==
1972 Iowa Hawkeyes football team roster
Players
Coaches
Offense

Pos.	#	Name	Class
QB	17	Butch Caldwell	Fr
QB	11	Kyle Skogman	Jr
QB	13	Frank Sunderman	Sr
RB	22	Jim Jensen	Fr
OL	72	Joe Devlin	Fr
C		Roger Jerrick	Jr
OL	60	Dan McCarney	So

Defense

Pos.	#	Name	Class
DL		Bill Windauer	Sr
LB	20	Andre Jackson	Fr
DE	87	Dan Dickel	Jr
DB	46	Earl Douthitt	So

Special teams

Pos.	#	Name	Class

Head coach

- Frank Lauterbur

Coordinators/assistant coaches

- Dennis Green – Graduate assistant
- Jack Harbaugh

Legend

- (C) Team captain
- (S) Suspended
- (I) Ineligible
- Injured
- Redshirt
