= 1972 Indiana Hoosiers football team =

American college football season

1972 Indiana Hoosiers football
- Conference: Big Ten Conference
- Record: 5–6 (3–5 Big Ten)
- Head coach: John Pont (8th season)
- MVP: Glenn Scolnik
- Captains: Ted McNulty; Joe Pawlitsch
- Home stadium: Memorial Stadium

1972 Big Ten Conference football standings
	Conf.					Overall
Team	W		L		T	W		L		T
No. 6 Michigan +	7	–	1	–	0	10	–	1	–	0
No. 9 Ohio State +	7	–	1	–	0	9	–	2	–	0
Purdue	6	–	2	–	0	6	–	5	–	0
Michigan State	5	–	2	–	1	5	–	5	–	1
Minnesota	4	–	4	–	0	4	–	7	–	0
Indiana	3	–	5	–	0	5	–	6	–	0
Illinois	3	–	5	–	0	3	–	8	–	0
Iowa	2	–	6	–	1	3	–	7	–	1
Wisconsin	2	–	6	–	0	4	–	7	–	0
Northwestern	1	–	8	–	0	2	–	9	–	0
+ – Conference co-champions; Rankings from AP Poll

The 1972 Indiana Hoosiers football team represented the Indiana Hoosiers in the 1972 Big Ten Conference football season. The Hoosiers played their home games at Memorial Stadium in Bloomington, Indiana. The team was coached by John Pont, in his eighth and final year as head coach of the Hoosiers, before being fired at the end of the season.

== Schedule ==
Date	Time	Opponent	Site	Result	Attendance	Source
September 16		Minnesota	Memorial Stadium; Bloomington, IN	W 27–23	35,783	
September 23		TCU*	Memorial Stadium; Bloomington, IN	L 28–31	34,004	
September 30		at Kentucky*	McLean Stadium; Lexington, KY (rivalry)	W 35–34	37,500	
October 7		at Syracuse*	Archbold Stadium; Syracuse, NY	W 10–2	18,444	
October 14		Wisconsin^{†}	Memorial Stadium; Bloomington, IN	W 33–7	50,122	
October 21	1:30 p.m.	at No. 4 Ohio State	Ohio Stadium; Columbus, OH	L 7–44	86,365	
October 28		at Northwestern	Dyche Stadium; Evanston, IL	L 14–23	32,007	
November 4		No. 4 Michigan	Memorial Stadium; Bloomington, IN	L 7–21	41,336	
November 11		at Illinois	Memorial Stadium; Champaign, IL (rivalry)	L 20–37	55,077	
November 18		Iowa	Memorial Stadium; Bloomington, IN	W 16–8	27,440	
November 25		at Purdue	Ross–Ade Stadium; West Lafayette, IN (Old Oaken Bucket)	L 7–42	65,065	
*Non-conference game; ^{†}Homecoming; Rankings from AP Poll released prior to the game; All times are in Eastern time

== 1973 NFL draftees ==
Player	Position	Round	Pick	NFL club
Mike Fulk	Linebacker	5	112	San Francisco 49ers
Glenn Scolnik	Wide receiver	6	154	Pittsburgh Steelers
Dan Lintner	Defensive back	8	184	Philadelphia Eagles
Rob Spicer	Linebacker	9	222	New York Jets
Ted McNulty	Quarterback	15	380	Cincinnati Bengals
