= 1972 Minnesota Golden Gophers football team =

American college football season

1972 Minnesota Golden Gophers football
- Conference: Big Ten Conference
- Record: 4–7 (4–4 Big Ten)
- Head coach: Cal Stoll (1st season)
- MVP: John King
- Captain: Bob Morgan
- Home stadium: Memorial Stadium

1972 Big Ten Conference football standings
	Conf.					Overall
Team	W		L		T	W		L		T
No. 6 Michigan +	7	–	1	–	0	10	–	1	–	0
No. 9 Ohio State +	7	–	1	–	0	9	–	2	–	0
Purdue	6	–	2	–	0	6	–	5	–	0
Michigan State	5	–	2	–	1	5	–	5	–	1
Minnesota	4	–	4	–	0	4	–	7	–	0
Indiana	3	–	5	–	0	5	–	6	–	0
Illinois	3	–	5	–	0	3	–	8	–	0
Iowa	2	–	6	–	1	3	–	7	–	1
Wisconsin	2	–	6	–	0	4	–	7	–	0
Northwestern	1	–	8	–	0	2	–	9	–	0
+ – Conference co-champions; Rankings from AP Poll

The 1972 Minnesota Golden Gophers football team represented the University of Minnesota in the 1972 Big Ten Conference football season. In their first year under head coach Cal Stoll, the Golden Gophers compiled a 4–7 record and were outscored by their opponents by a combined total of 304 to 185.

Fullback John King received the team's Most Valuable Player award. King was also named All-Big Ten first team. Defensive back Tim Alderson was named All-Big Ten second team. Offensive lineman Doug Kingsriter was named Academic All-Big Ten.

Total attendance for the season was 221,553, which averaged to 36,925. The season high for attendance was against Iowa.

== Schedule ==
Date	Opponent	Site	Result	Attendance	Source
September 16	at Indiana	Memorial Stadium; Bloomington, IN	L 23–27	35,783	
September 23	No. 3 Colorado*	Memorial Stadium; Minneapolis, MN	L 6–38	42,703	
September 30	at No. 7 Nebraska*	Memorial Stadium; Lincoln, NE (rivalry)	L 0–49	76,217	
October 7	Kansas*	Memorial Stadium; Minneapolis, MN	L 28–34	31,595	
October 14	Purdue	Memorial Stadium; Minneapolis, MN	L 3–28	37,287	
October 21	Iowa^{†}	Memorial Stadium; Minneapolis, MN (rivalry)	W 43–14	44,196	
October 28	at No. 5 Michigan	Michigan Stadium; Ann Arbor, MI (Little Brown Jug)	L 0–42	84,190	
November 4	at No. 5 Ohio State	Ohio Stadium; Columbus, OH	L 19–27	86,439	
November 11	Northwestern	Memorial Stadium; Minneapolis, MN	W 35–29	32,771	
November 18	Michigan State	Memorial Stadium; Minneapolis, MN	W 14–10	33,001	
November 25	at Wisconsin	Camp Randall Stadium; Madison, WI (rivalry)	W 14–6	60,746	
*Non-conference game; ^{†}Homecoming; Rankings from AP Poll released prior to the game

== Roster ==
1972 Minnesota Golden Gophers football team roster
Players
Coaches
Offense

Pos.	#	Name	Class
OT	72	Matt Herkenhoff	Jr
TE	83	Doug Kingsriter	Sr
OT	71	Dave Simonson	Jr

Defense

Pos.	#	Name	Class
DB	22	Doug Beaudoin	Fr
LB	33	Tom MacLeod	Sr
DE	97	Steve Neils	Fr

Special teams

Pos.	#	Name	Class

Head coach

- Cal Stoll

Coordinators/assistant coaches

Legend

- (C) Team captain
- (S) Suspended
- (I) Ineligible
- Injured
- Redshirt

Roster
