= Fred Grambau =

American gridiron football player (1950–2017)

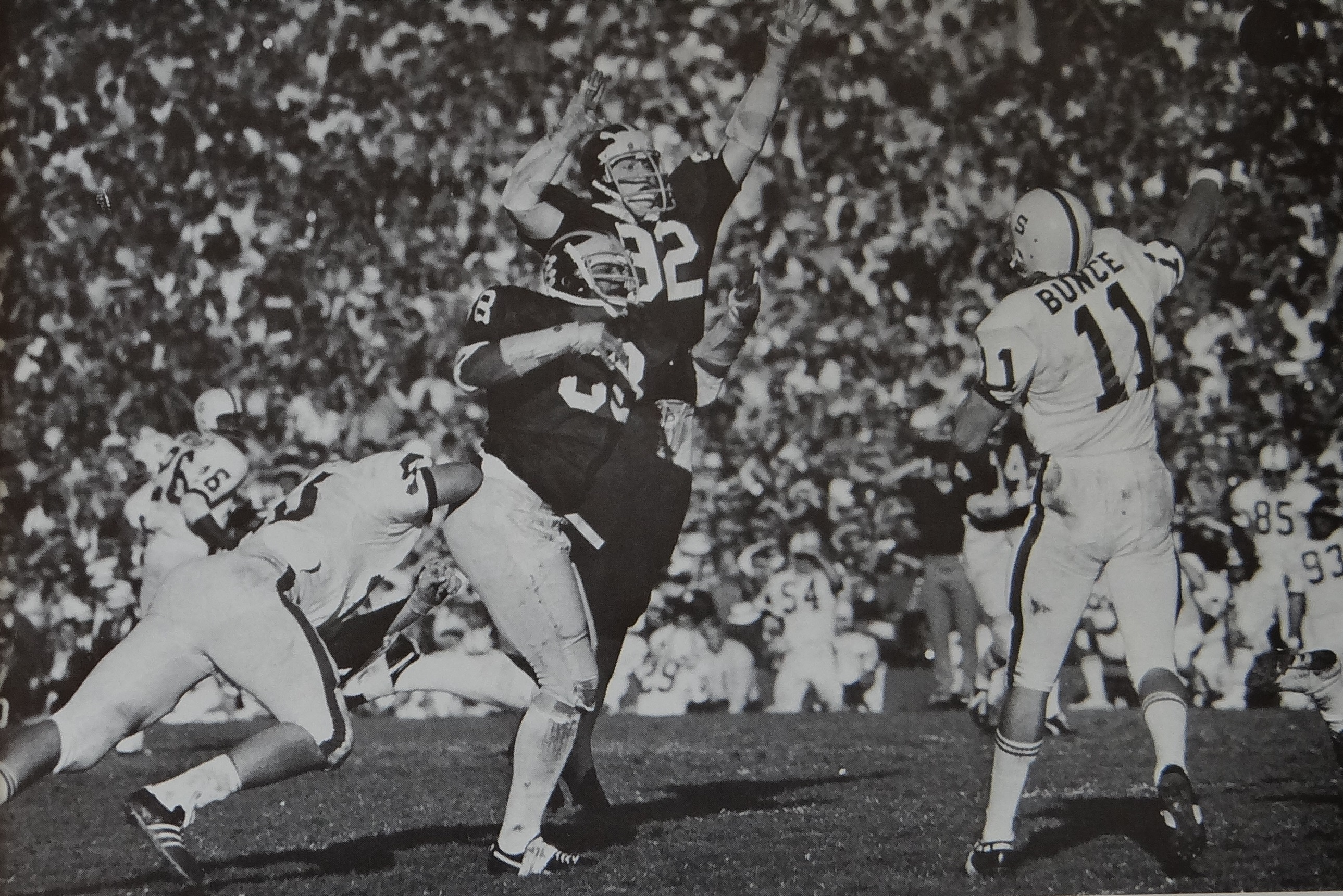
- Grambau rushing Don Bunce in the 1972 Rose Bowl

Profile
- Position: Defensive tackle

Personal information
- Born: August 30, 1950; Michigan, U.S.
- Died: December 13, 2017 (aged 67)

Career information
- College: Michigan

Career history
- Hamilton Tiger-Cats (1973–1975)

Awards and highlights
- First-team All-Big Ten (1972)

Frederick E. Grambau (August 30, 1950 – December 13, 2017) was an American football defensive end. He played college football for the University of Michigan from 1969 to 1972 and professionally for the Hamilton Tiger-Cats from 1973 to 1975.

== Michigan ==
A native of Ossineke, Michigan, Grambau attended Alpena High School. He later played college football as a defensive tackle at the University of Michigan from 1969 to 1972. He missed the 1970 season with a knee injury, but returned to the Wolverines in 1971.

As a senior, Grambau started all 11 games at the defensive left tackle position for the 1972 Michigan Wolverines football team that compiled a 10-1 record, allowed opponents to score only 57 points (5.2 points per game), and finished the season ranked No. 6 in both the AP and UPI polls. He was selected as a first-team All-Big Ten Conference player in 1972. He was also selected as a starter on defense for the East team in the 1972 East–West Shrine Game in San Francisco.

== Professional football ==
Grambau was drafted by the Kansas City Chiefs in the fifth round (120th overall pick) of the 1973 NFL draft. He played professional football for the Hamilton Tiger-Cats in the Canadian Football League (CFL) from 1973 to 1974. He was selected as an All-CFL defensive player in 1974. In July 1975, he was placed on the injury reserve list with knee problems. He signed a contract to play for the Montreal Alouettes in March 1976.

== Death ==
Grambau died in 2017.
