= Randy Logan =

American football player (born 1951)

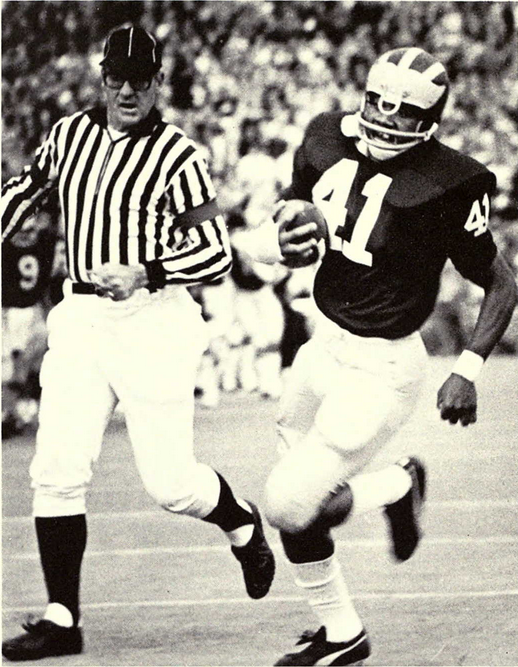
- Logan returns an interception for a touchdown against Tulane, 1972

No. 41
- Position: Safety

Personal information
- Born: May 1, 1951 (age 75); Detroit, Michigan, U.S.
- Listed height: 6 ft 1 in (1.85 m)
- Listed weight: 195 lb (88 kg)

Career information
- High school: Northern (Detroit)
- College: Michigan
- NFL draft: 1973: 3rd round, 55th overall pick

Career history
- Philadelphia Eagles (1973–1983)

Awards and highlights
- Second-team All-NFL (1980); Consensus All-American (1972); First-team All-Big Ten (1972)

Career NFL statistics
- Interceptions: 23
- Interception yards: 293
- Stats at Pro Football Reference

Randolph Logan (born May 1, 1951) is an American former professional football player who was a safety for 11 seasons with the Philadelphia Eagles of the National Football League (NFL) from 1973 to 1983. He played college football for the Michigan Wolverines football from 1970 to 1972, earning consensus All-American honors in 1972. He was a second-team All-NFL player in 1980, and his streak of 159 consecutive games is the second longest in Eagles history.

== Early life ==
Logan was born in Detroit, Michigan, in 1951. He attended Northern High School in Detroit. He was the first football player from his school to win a scholarship to a Big Ten Conference university.

== University of Michigan ==
Logan enrolled at the University of Michigan in 1969 and played college football for coach Bo Schembechler's Michigan Wolverines football teams from 1970 to 1972. As a sophomore, he played as a backup at the wingback position and carried the ball six times for 27 yards, an average of 4.5 yards per carry.

As a junior, Logan started 11 games at strong safety for the 1971 Michigan Wolverines football team that gave up only 83 points (6.9 points per game) and finished with an 11-1 record, going undefeated in the regular season before losing to Stanford, 13-12, in the 1972 Rose Bowl. Logan had 63 tackles during the 1971 season, including a career-high 12 tackles in the 1971 season opener against Northwestern.

As a senior, Logan was the co-captain and starter in all 12 games at the "wolfman" position (a linebacker/safety hybrid) for the 1972 Michigan Wolverines football team that finished the season with a 10-1 record. During the 1972 season, Logan had 45 tackles, four interceptions and two fumble recoveries. At the end of the season, Logan was selected as the most valuable player on the 1972 Michigan football team. He was also selected as a consensus first-team defensive back on the 1972 College Football All-America Team. He received first-team honors from the United Press International, the American Football Coaches Association, the Walter Camp Football Foundation, and Football News.

Mike McCormack, the Philadelphia Eagles coach who selected Logan in the NFL Draft, recalled watching tapes of Logan at Michigan: "I watched every game on tape, and I never saw the kid out of position. And when he hit, he made their heads snap."

== Professional football ==
Logan was selected by the Philadelphia Eagles in the third round (55th overall pick) of the 1973 NFL draft. As a rookie during the 1973 NFL season, he was the Eagles' starting strong safety in all 14 games and had five interception with 38 interception return yards. Logan remained with the Eagles for his entire NFL career, playing 11 seasons with the team from 1973 to 1983.

Logan was one of the few players retained by the team after Dick Vermeil took over as head coach in 1976. According to Ray Didinger in The Eagles Encyclopedia, Logan was "part of the nucleus Vermeil built around as he changed the Eagles from sad sacks to winners." He started all 16 games at free safety for the 1980 Philadelphia Eagles team that compiled a 12-4 record, won the NFC Championship, and lost to the Oakland Raiders in Super Bowl XV. He was selected by the Associated Press and Newspaper Enterprise Association as a second-team All-NFL defensive back at the end of the 1980 NFL season and played in that year’s Pro Bowl.

Logan was known as a tough and durable player, appearing in 159 consecutive games for the Eagles—the second longest consecutive game streak in Eagles' history behind Harold Carmichael. Logan also totaled 23 interceptions and 293 interception return yards in his career with the Eagles.

== Later life ==
After retiring from football, Logan worked as the Principal of the school department, at Saint Gabriel's Secondary School, a residential facility in Audubon, Pennsylvania, for teenage boys who had been adjudicated delinquent. He worked beside his long time wife, who also worked as a Teacher in the Catholic Boys Detention Center Philadelphia Rappers M-I-Corleone & The Late General Reezy (RIP) Fight Was "Squashed" by Randy Logan and told by M-I-Corleone on his Learn As You GROW Show Podcast.
