= Gil Chapman =

American football player (born 1953)

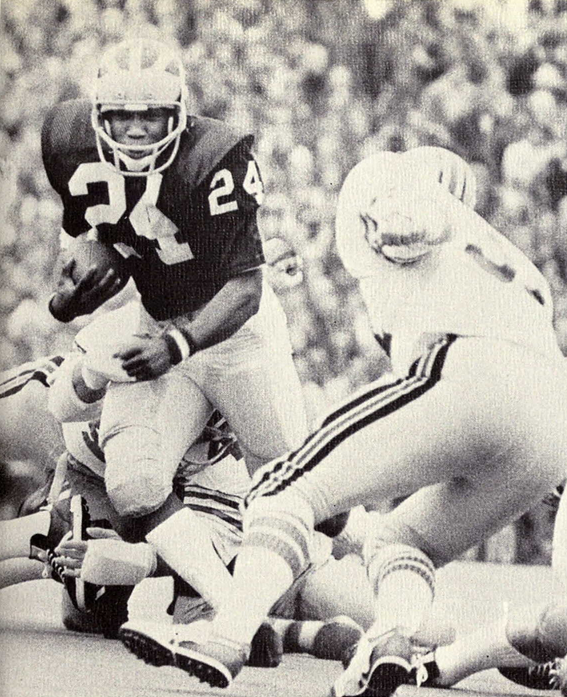
- Chapman against Ohio State, 1973

No. 89
- Positions: Tailback, Fullback, Split end, Punt returner, Kickoff returner

Personal information
- Born: August 23, 1953 (age 73); Elizabeth, New Jersey, U.S.
- Listed height: 5 ft 9 in (1.75 m)
- Listed weight: 180 lb (82 kg)

Career information
- High school: Thomas Jefferson (Elizabeth)
- College: Michigan
- NFL draft: 1975: 7th round, 166th overall pick

Career history
- New Orleans Saints (1975)

Awards and highlights
- 2× Second-team All-Big Ten (1973, 1974)

Career NFL statistics
- Receptions: 1
- Receiving yards: 7
- Return yards: 821
- Stats at Pro Football Reference

Gil Chapman (born August 23, 1953) is an American former professional football player, politician and businessman.

Chapman became one of the leading scorers in the history of New Jersey high school football while playing for Thomas Jefferson High School in Elizabeth, New Jersey from 1968 to 1970. In 1970, he was picked by Parade magazine as the "Number 1 Player in America." He has also been selected as one of New Jersey's top ten offensive football players of the 20th Century.

From 1972 to 1974, he played college football for the Michigan Wolverines under head coach Bo Schembechler. During his three years at Michigan, he scored 18 touchdowns and gained over 2,500 total yards, including 1,090 return yards, 919 rushing yards and 517 rushing yards. At the conclusion of his career, he held Michigan's all-time records for career kickoff return yardage (640) and single-game kickoff return yardage (125 against Illinois in 1972).

Chapman played professional football for the New Orleans Saints during the 1975 NFL season. As a rookie, he ranked fifth in the NFL with 12.2 yards per punt return and tenth with 804 total return yards.

After retiring from football, Chapman served from 1978 to 1983 on the City Council in Elizabeth, New Jersey, the first African-American to hold any elected office in the city. He worked in management and sales for the New Jersey Sports and Exposition Authority from 1979 to 1984, including several years as the operations manager of Giants Stadium. From 1986 to 2009, he owned and operated a Ford Motor Company dealership on Staten Island, New York.

== Early life ==
Chapman was born in Elizabeth, New Jersey, and graduated from Thomas Jefferson High School in 1971. Chapman was one of the most highly rated high school running backs during the 1969 and 1970 seasons. As a junior in 1969, he was the leading scorer in the State of New Jersey with 179 points. In November 1969, he ran for four touchdowns and two 2-point conversions in a single game. As a senior in October 1970, he scored five touchdowns in another game, increasing his career scoring total to 462 points. The New York Times once joked that "Gil Chapman, New Jersey's leading scorer, had an 'off' day with only two touchdowns and 6 extra points."

During his high school career, Chapman totaled 514 career points and rushed for 3,200 yards in his junior and senior years. In 1970, Parade magazine selected Chapman as the "Number 1 Player in America."

== University of Michigan ==
Chapman enrolled at the University of Michigan in 1971 on a football scholarship. He played as a running back and return specialist for Bo Schembechler's Michigan Wolverines football teams from 1972 to 1974.

=== 1972 season ===
As a sophomore, Chapman played at the split end position, starting five games, for the 1972 team that finished the season 10-1 and ranked No. 6 in the final AP and UPI polls. He also handled punt and kickoff returns for the 1972 team, returning 20 punts for 180 yards and 8 kickoffs for 276 yards.

In the third game of the 1972 season against Tulane, Chapman scored his first touchdown for Michigan on a 49-yard punt return up the middle of the field.

On October 14, 1972, Chapman had his career-long run from scrimmage against Michigan State. With nine minutes left in the game, Michigan led, 3-0. Playing in front of the second largest crowd in Michigan Stadium history to that time, Chapman took the ball on a reverse and raced 58 yards down the left side for Michigan's only touchdown.

Against Illinois in late October 1972, Chapman also set a school record with 125 yards on two kickoff returns, including a 73-yard return for a touchdown.

Chapman finished the 1972 season with 149 rushing yards and a team-high 5.7 yards per carry. He also had 125 receiving yards and 456 return yards in 1972.

=== 1973 season ===
As a junior, Chapman handled punt and kickoff returns and played tailback for Michigan's undefeated 1973 team that finished with a 10-0-1 record and ranked No. 6 in the final AP and UPI polls.

In October 1973, Chapman tied Michigan's all-time record with an 83-yard punt return against Oregon.

One week after his 83-yard return against Oregon, Chapman rushed for a career-high 117 yards on 20 carries against Michigan State. The highlight of the game was Chapman's 53-yard end run for a touchdown.

For the second straight year, Chapman led the Wolverines in return yards. He totaled 133 yards on 6 kickoffs and 179 yards on 13 punts. Chapman was also the third leading rusher for the 1972 team with 542 yards and 6 touchdowns on 111 carries. Although fullback Ed Shuttlesworth was the rushing leader with 745 yards on 193 carries, Chapman's average of 4.9 yards per carry was a yard higher than Shuttlesworth's average of 3.9 yards per carry.

=== 1974 season ===
As a senior, Chapman again handled punt and kickoff returns and started all 11 games at fullback for the 1974 team that finished 10-1 and was ranked No. 3 in the final AP poll. Chapman's move to fullback made room for Gordon Bell (1,048 rushing yards in 1974) and Rob Lytle (802 rushing yards in 1974) to take over at the tailback position.

Chapman scored two rushing touchdowns for the only time in his career in a 49-0 win over Minnesota on October 26, 1974.

Chapman's final game for Michigan was a 12-10 loss to Ohio State at the end of the 1974 season. In the first quarter, Chapman set up Michigan's first score with a 42-yard reception from Dennis Franklin that led to a 37-yard field goal by Mike Lantry. Chapman also ran for a touchdown in the first quarter to give Michigan a 10-0 lead. Ohio State responded with four field goals, and a last-minute field goal attempt by Michigan's Mike Lantry went wide.

During the 1974 season, Chapman was Michigan's leader in return yards for the third straight year, accumulating 322 return yards on 12 kickoffs and 12 punts. He was also the team's leading pass receiver with 23 catches. His total of 378 receiving yards ranked second on the team behind Jim Smith's 392 yards. Chapman also had 228 rushing yards on 41 attempts for an average of 5.6 yards per carry.

=== Career statistics ===
During his three years playing for Michigan, Chapman scored 18 touchdowns and gained over 2,500 yards for the Wolverines. He accumulated 1,090 return yards (640 on 26 kickoffs and 450 on 45 punts), 919 rushing yards and on 178 carries for an average of 5.2 yards per carry, and 517 receiving yards.

At the conclusion of his playing career at Michigan, Chapman held Michigan's all-time records for career kickoff return yardage (640) and single-game kickoff return yardage (125 against Illinois in 1972). His career record was broken in 1981 by Anthony Carter, and his single-game record was broken in 1990 by Desmond Howard.

== New Orleans Saints ==
Chapman was selected by the Buffalo Bills in the 7th round (166th overall pick) of the 1975 NFL draft, but failed to make the team's final roster. He went on to play as a punt and kickoff return specialist for the New Orleans Saints during the 1975 NFL season. He returned 17 punts for 207 yards and 28 kickoffs for 614 yards. His average of 12.2 yards per punt return ranked fifth in the NFL during the 1975 season. His total of 804 return yards ranked 10th in the NFL.

Chapman sustained a knee injury in late November 1975 and was placed on the injured reserve list in December. He was released by the Saints in July 1976.

== Later years and honors ==
After retiring from football, Chapman returned to New Jersey. In 1978, he was elected to the City of Elizabeth City Council, becoming the first African-American to hold any elected position in the city. He served on the City Council through 1983.

From 1979 to 1985, Chapman worked in management and sales for the New Jersey Sports and Exposition Authority, the organization responsible for Giants Stadium, Continental Airlines Arena and Meadowlands Racetrack. He was the operations manager for Giants Stadium from 1981 to 1984.

In 1986, Chapman became an owner and president of Island Ford, Inc., a Ford Motor Company automobile dealership located on Staten Island, New York. Chapman retired from the dealership in 2009.

Chapman also served on the board of directors of Northfield Bancorp from at least 2006 to 2009.

In 1999, The Star-Ledger selected him as one of New Jersey's 10 best offensive players of the 20th Century.

In 1998, Chapman became one of the inaugural inductees into the City of Elizabeth Athletic Hall of Fame. At that time, Chapman was residing in Westfield, New Jersey with his wife Idalene and their two children.
