= Otis Armstrong =

American football player (1950–2021)

No. 24
- Position: Running back

Personal information
- Born: November 15, 1950; Chicago, Illinois, U.S.
- Died: October 13, 2021 (aged 70); Englewood, Colorado, U.S.
- Listed height: 5 ft 10 in (1.78 m)
- Listed weight: 196 lb (89 kg)

Career information
- High school: Farragut Career Academy (Chicago)
- College: Purdue
- NFL draft: 1973: 1st round, 9th overall pick

Career history
- Denver Broncos (1973–1980)

Awards and highlights
- First-team All-Pro (1974); 2× Pro Bowl (1974, 1976); NFL rushing yards leader (1974); Coffman Award (1972); Consensus All-American (1972); Chicago Tribune Silver Football (1972); Nils V. "Swede" Nelson Award (1972); First-team All-Big Ten (1972); Second-team All-Big Ten (1971)

Career NFL statistics
- Rushing yards: 4,453
- Rushing average: 4.4
- Rushing touchdowns: 25
- Stats at Pro Football Reference
- College Football Hall of Fame

Otis D. Armstrong (November 15, 1950 – October 13, 2021) was an American professional football player who was a running back in the National Football League (NFL). He was selected in the first round with the ninth overall pick in the 1973 NFL draft. He played for the Denver Broncos for his entire career from 1973 to 1980.

== Early life ==
Armstrong attended Chicago's Farragut High School and was inducted into the Chicagoland Sports Hall of Fame.

== College career ==
Before his NFL career, Armstrong played for Purdue University, becoming the school's all-time leading rusher and leader in all-purpose yards. Armstrong was selected to Purdue's All-Time team in 1987 as part of a celebration of 100 years of football at Purdue. He was inducted into the Purdue Intercollegiate Athletics Hall of Fame in 1997.

Year	Rushing Yards	Rushing TD	Receiving Yards	Receiving TD
1970	1,006	2	148	1
1971	945	6	186	4
1972	1,361	9	55	0
Total	3,312	17	389	5

Armstrong finished his three college seasons with 4,601 All-purpose yards (3,315 rushing yards, 897 yards from kickoff returns and 389 passing yards). He also scored 24 touchdowns (17 rushing and seven on returns). Armstrong was selected the Big Ten MVP in 1972, leading the league in rushing and total offense, while being selected 1st team All-Conference. He participated in four All-Star games; the Hula Bowl, the East-West Shrine Game, the Coaches' All-American Game, and the Chicago College All-Star game.

Over the course of his Purdue career, Armstrong became the all-time leading rusher in Big Ten Conference and Purdue history and ranked sixth in NCAA history at the time. His total of 3,315 yards in three years bettered the previous mark of 3,212 yards by Alan Ameche of Wisconsin - established in four years. He still holds the Purdue single game rushing record (276 yds vs. arch-rival Indiana.) Armstrong finished as the all-time leader in All-Purpose yards at Purdue (4,601 yds), he is currently fourth all-time.

On May 16, 2012; Armstrong was selected for induction into the College Football Hall of Fame. Armstrong became the 13th Boilermaker (nine players, four coaches) inducted into the College Football Hall of Fame.

== Professional career ==
Armstrong was selected in the first round by the Denver Broncos with the ninth overall pick in the 1973 NFL draft. In 1974, his second NFL season, Armstrong led the league in rushing yards (1,407) and yards per carry (5.3). In the 1977 season, he assisted the Denver Broncos to an appearance in Super Bowl XII, which they lost to the Dallas Cowboys 27–10.

Armstrong finished his eight NFL seasons with 4,453 rushing yards, 123 receptions for 1,302 receiving yards, and 879 yards from kickoff returns. He also scored 32 touchdowns (25 rushing and seven receiving).

== Death ==
Otis Armstrong died on October 13, 2021, surrounded by his family and loved ones. He was 70.

== NFL career statistics ==
Legend
	Led the league
**Bold**	Career high

Year	Team	Games		Rushing					Receiving				
Year	Team	GP	GS	Att	Yds	Avg	Lng	TD	Rec	Yds	Avg	Lng	TD
1973	DEN	14	1	26	90	3.5	24	0	2	43	**21.5**	36	1
1974	DEN	14	14	**263**	**1,407**	**5.3**	**43**	**9**	38	405	10.7	**48**	**3**
1975	DEN	4	3	31	155	5.0	33	0	1	10	10.0	10	0
1976	DEN	14	14	247	1,008	4.1	31	5	**39**	**457**	11.7	36	1
1977	DEN	10	10	130	489	3.8	35	4	18	128	7.1	20	0
1978	DEN	16	9	112	381	3.4	20	1	12	98	8.2	19	1
1979	DEN	15	1	108	453	4.2	26	2	14	138	9.9	17	1
1980	DEN	9	6	106	470	4.4	20	4	7	23	3.3	8	0
Career		96	58	1,023	4,453	4.4	43	25	131	1,302	9.9	48	7
