= Mike Lantry =

American football player

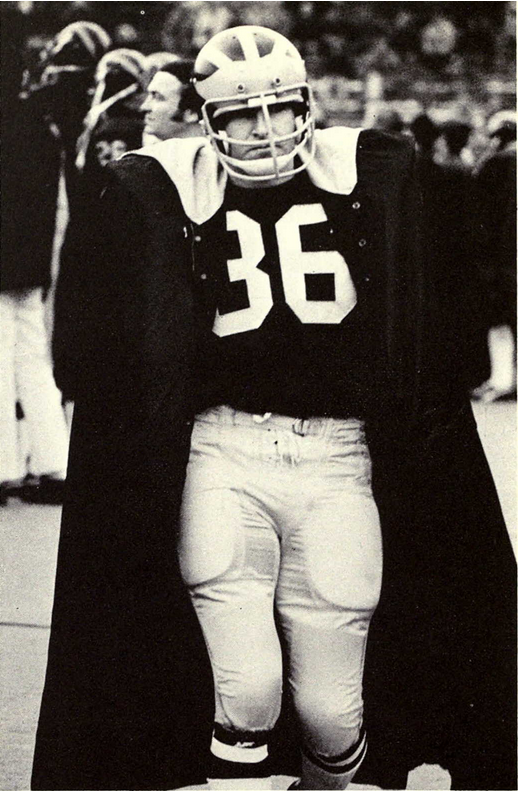
Lantry from 1973 Michiganensian

Mike Lantry (born c. 1948) is a former All-American football player. He was a left-footed place-kicker who played for Bo Schembechler at the University of Michigan from 1972 through 1974. He was selected as a first-team All-American in 1973 and set Michigan records for the longest field goal, most field goals, and most point after touchdown kicks. However, he also missed three key field goals in the last minutes of the 1973 and 1974 Michigan–Ohio State games. He also missed a field goal in the 1972 OSU game that would have tied the game.

== Early years and military service ==
A native of Oxford, Michigan, Lantry enlisted in the U.S. Army after graduating from high school. He spent three years in the Army, including service in the Vietnam War. Lantry's experiences in Vietnam and Michigan were the subject of Michael Rosenberg's 2008 book, War As They Knew It: Woody Hayes, Bo Schembechler, and America in a Time of Unrest. Lantry later recalled, "For a full year, my parents agonized, hoping they wouldn't get the call that so many other parents received." In 2007, Lantry described himself as "a proud Vietnam veteran".

== University of Michigan ==
After his discharge from the Army, Lantry enrolled at the University of Michigan in 1971. Unlike most college athletes, Lantry was a 23-year-old freshman who was married, had a young child, and had seen combat action in Vietnam. And he had no scholarship. He made the Michigan football team as a walk-on. Lantry earned a spot on the team in 1971 and was Michigan's first-string place-kicker for all 33 games of the 1972, 1973 and 1974 seasons. In addition to football, Lantry was also a shot putter who earned three varsity letters at Michigan. Lantry graduated from Michigan's School of Education in 1975.

=== 1973 season ===
In September 1973, Lantry broke the Michigan record for longest field goal twice in the same quarter of a single football game. Nine seconds into the second quarter of a 47–10 win over Stanford, Lantry kicked a 50-yard field goal to break the school record. In the waning moments of the quarter, Lantry broke his own record by kicking a 51-yard field goal. After the record was broken twice in the span of a 15-minute quarter, Lantry's record stood for 11 years until 1984 when Bob Bergeron kicked a 52-yard field goal for Michigan.

In the 1973 Michigan–Ohio State game, Lantry missed two key fourth-quarter field goal attempts. With the game tied 10–10, and 1:01 remaining in the game, Lantry attempted a 58-yard field goal but the kick was wide to the left, missing by inches. Michigan intercepted an Ohio State pass on the first play of the ensuing drive, and Lantry got another shot at a game-winning field goal with 24 seconds left to play. His attempt at a 44-yard field goal went wide by about three inches, and the game ended in a 10–10 tie. Both teams finished the 1973 season with identical 10–0–1 records, and the Big Ten Conference athletic directors voted to send Ohio State to the 1974 Rose Bowl. Because Big Ten rules at that time allowed only one team to play in a post-season bowl game, Michigan did not play in a bowl game despite having an undefeated season.

Lantry was selected by Football News as a first-team All-American in 1973.

=== 1974 season ===
In his senior season in 1974, Lantry broke the Michigan school record for most field goals and point after touchdown kicks. The prior record of 107 point after touchdown kicks had stood since 1947.

Lantry was again called on to attempt a critical field goal in the 1974 Michigan-Ohio State game. Ohio State led 12–10 nearing the end of the fourth quarter. Lantry was brought in to attempt a game-winning field goal and a chance for redemption. One newspaper described the scene as follows:

There were 16 seconds to play when Mike Lantry's left leg boomed the ball. The distance was 33 yards. The angle was very bad and very tough and from a wide side of the field. Mike Lantry's kick was very high. The officials looked for an agonizingly long, long time. They finally made their signal No good. Wide. Not by much. Inches again. But still no good. Close. There was that word again, that awful word that had tormented Mike Lantry for a whole year. Close."

The game was broadcast on national television, and as Ohio State fans came flooding onto the field to celebrate, the camera followed Lantry as he picked up his tee, and in the words of game announcer Keith Jackson "walked disconsolately toward the sideline." The image of Lantry walking slowly to the sideline became one of the iconic images of the Michigan–Ohio State rivalry. Because of the severe angle, several people believed Lantry's kick was actually good, and this has been used to advocate for the use of cameras on the uprights to permit replay review of ambiguous kicks in the future.

The Chicago Tribune opened its coverage of the game with the line, "Mike Lantry served in the Viet Nam War and he had reason to believe the worst was over—until Saturday." After consecutive years with disappointments on last-minute field goal attempts, one sports writer joked that "perhaps the state of Michigan was going to form a lynch mob for Mike Lantry." Instead, Lantry received thousands of letters from fans expressing compassion, sympathy and encouragement. Even Ohio State Coach Woody Hayes expressed his sympathy for Lantry: "I hate to see that happen to a kid like that because he served his country in Vietnam, but if it had to happen, I'm glad it happened against us." Lantry told reporters at the time, "I guess the biggest surprise is the way people have acted. They're suffering with me. They've been more than kind. I wish there was a way I could thank them all."

Interviewed in 2004 about the missed kick in the 1974 Ohio State game, Lantry recalled: "I was numb. That was the final play of my college career right there. Everything you worked for, those glorious years of competition, my teammates. ... If we had won that game, we would have played in the Rose Bowl. We could have shot to the top of the AP and UPI rankings. Who knows? That was like the World Series: bases loaded, bottom of the ninth, two outs, a 3–2 count. It was on my foot, but it didn't happen."

== See also ==
- 1973 College Football All-America Team
