= 1973 Michigan Wolverines football team =

American college football season

1973 Michigan Wolverines football

Big Ten co-champion
- Conference: Big Ten Conference

Ranking
- Coaches: No. 6
- AP: No. 6
- Record: 10–0–1 (7–0–1 Big Ten)
- Head coach: Bo Schembechler (5th season)
- Defensive coordinator: Gary Moeller (1st season)
- MVP: Paul Seal
- Captains: Dave Gallagher; Paul Seal
- Home stadium: Michigan Stadium

1973 Big Ten Conference football standings
	Conf.					Overall
Team	W		L		T	W		L		T
No. 2 Ohio State +	7	–	0	–	1	10	–	0	–	1
No. 6 Michigan +	7	–	0	–	1	10	–	0	–	1
Minnesota	6	–	2	–	0	7	–	4	–	0
Illinois	4	–	4	–	0	5	–	6	–	0
Michigan State	4	–	4	–	0	5	–	6	–	0
Purdue	4	–	4	–	0	5	–	6	–	0
Northwestern	4	–	4	–	0	4	–	7	–	0
Wisconsin	3	–	5	–	0	4	–	7	–	0
Indiana	0	–	8	–	0	2	–	9	–	0
Iowa	0	–	8	–	0	0	–	11	–	0
+ – Conference co-champions; Rankings from AP Poll

The 1973 Michigan Wolverines football team represented the University of Michigan in the 1973 Big Ten Conference football season. In his fifth year as Michigan's head coach, Bo Schembechler led the team to a 10–0–1 record. It was Michigan's first undefeated season since 1948. The Wolverines outscored their opponents 330 to 68. Michigan was ranked No. 6 in both major polls, the AP (which took a final poll after bowl games) and UPI (which ended balloting when the regular season concluded). Two other selectors, the National Championship Foundation and the Poling System, recognize Michigan as a co-national champion for the 1973 season, but the school does not claim either championship.

The season ended with a 10–10 tie against Ohio State. Both teams were undefeated, with the winner to play the Rose Bowl. When the game ended in a tie, the Big Ten Conference athletic directors voted to send Ohio State to the Rose Bowl. Michigan athletic officials and fans were outraged, with even Vice President of the United States Gerald Ford, a Michigan All-American in the 1930s, speaking out against the decision.

On offense, the team was led by quarterback Dennis Franklin who completed 36 of 67 passes for 534 yards and rushed 101 times for 425 yards. Four Michigan running backs, Ed Shuttlesworth, Chuck Heater, Gil Chapman, and Gordon Bell, combined for 2,417 rushing yards. Shuttlesworth, Franklin, wing back Clint Haslerig, and offensive guard Mike Hoban were all selected as All-Big Ten Conference players. Tight end Paul Seal was selected for the team's Most Valuable Player award.

On defense, the Wolverines held opponents to 68 points, an average of 6.2 points per game. Defensive tackle Dave Gallagher and defensive back Dave Brown were both selected as consensus first-team All-Americans. Middle linebacker Steve Strinko led the team with 77 solo tackles and 108 total tackles.

== Schedule ==
Date	Time	Opponent	Rank	Site	TV	Result	Attendance
September 15		at Iowa	No. 5	Kinnick Stadium; Iowa City, IA		W 31–7	52,105
September 22	1:30 p.m.	Stanford*	No. 5	Michigan Stadium; Ann Arbor, MI		W 47–10	80,177
September 29	1:30 p.m.	Navy*	No. 4	Michigan Stadium; Ann Arbor, MI		W 14–0	88,042
October 6		Oregon*	No. 5	Michigan Stadium; Ann Arbor, MI		W 24–0	81,113
October 13		at Michigan State	No. 5	Spartan Stadium; East Lansing, MI (rivalry)		W 31–0	78,263
October 20		Wisconsin^{†}	No. 4	Michigan Stadium; Ann Arbor, MI		W 35–6	87,723
October 27		at Minnesota	No. 4	Memorial Stadium; Minneapolis, MN (Little Brown Jug)		W 34–7	44,435
November 3		Indiana	No. 4	Michigan Stadium; Ann Arbor, MI		W 49–13	76,432
November 10		Illinois	No. 4	Michigan Stadium; Ann Arbor, MI (rivalry)		W 22–6	76,461
November 17		at Purdue	No. 4	Ross–Ade Stadium; West Lafayette, IN		W 34–9	56,485
November 24		No. 1 Ohio State	No. 4	Michigan Stadium; Ann Arbor, MI (The Game)	ABC	T 10–10	105,223
*Non-conference game; ^{†}Homecoming; Rankings from AP Poll released prior to the game; All times are in Eastern time

== Season summary ==
=== Preseason ===
The 1972 Michigan team had compiled a 10–0-1 record and were ranked sixth in the final Coaches and AP Polls. Important players from the 1972 team who were lost to graduation included offensive guard Tom Coyle, center Bill Hart, tight end Paul Seymour, defensive tackle Fred Grambau, and defensive back Randy Logan. Important players returning to the 1973 team included quarterback Dennis Franklin, fullback Ed Shuttlesworth, tailback Chuck Heater, tight end Paul Seal, wing back Clint Haslerig, defensive back Dave Brown, defensive tackle Dave Gallagher, and defensive end Don Coleman.

In April 1973, Michigan's recruiting class for the incoming class of 1973 was finalized. The class of 24 recruits included running back Rob Lytle and wide receiver Jim Smith. Also in April, Michigan held its annual spring football game matching the "blue" and "white" squads against each other. Sophomore running back Gordon Bell reportedly "sparkled" with 75 rushing yards on 12 carries.

Before the start of the season, head coach Bo Schembechler told the media that he was "very, very high" on Dennis Franklin and that he planned on using a "balanced attack" with two-thirds running plays and one-third passing.

Schembechler also stated that he took special pride in the 30 seniors on his 1973 team. Schembechler had recruited the senior class after suffering a heart attack following the 1969 season. He recalled, "My assistant coaches would bring them to my house. I'd get out of bed and put on a coat and tie. Then after they left I'd go back to bed, but I wanted to talk to them myself. I wanted them to know that Bo Schembechler was going to coach them if they came to Michigan."

In the pre-season polls, Michigan was ranked No. 5 by the Associated Press (AP) and No. 6 by the United Press International (UPI) with Ohio State No. 2 in the AP and No. 3 in the UPI poll. USC was ranked No. 1 in both polls. Former Michigan State coach Duffy Daugherty predicted Michigan, based on its strong offensive and defensive backfields, would win the Big Ten Conference championship.

=== At Iowa ===
Team	1	2	3	4	Total
• Michigan	10	7	7	7	31
Iowa	0	7	0	0	7

- Date: September 15
- Location: Kinnick Stadium, Iowa City
- Game attendance: 52,105

Scoring summary
1	Michigan	Lantry 39-yard field goal	Michigan 3–0
1	Michigan	Heater 1-yard run (Lantry kick)	Michigan 10–0
2	Iowa	Douthitt 47-yard interception return (Kokolus kick)	Michigan 10–7
2	Michigan	Thornbladh 3-yard run (Lantry kick)	Michigan 17–7
3	Michigan	Chapman 12-yard run (Lantry kick)	Michigan 24–7
4	Michigan	Franklin 11-yard run (Lantry kick)	Michigan 31–7

On September 15, 1973, Michigan opened its season with a 31–7 victory over Iowa in front of a crowd of 52,105 at Kinnick Stadium in Iowa City. The Wolverines rushed for 440 yards against the Hawkeyes, led by tailback Chuck Heater (133 yards and a touchdown), fullback Ed Shuttlesworth (88 yards), Gil Chapman (69 yards and a touchdown), quarterback Dennis Franklin (62 yards and a touchdown), and Gordon Bell (50 yards). Franklin completed only two of eight passes for 26 yards and threw two interceptions. In the second quarter, Iowa's Earl Douthitt returned an interception 47 yards for Iowa's only touchdown. Mike Lantry also kicked a 39-yard field goal and converted all four extra point attempts. Linebacker Steve Strinko led Michigan with 10 tackles and three assists.

=== Stanford ===
Team	1	2	3	4	Total
Stanford	0	0	3	7	10
• Michigan	21	13	7	6	47

- Date: September 22
- Location: Michigan Stadium

Scoring summary
1	MICH	Heater 8 yard run (Lantry kick)	MICH 7–0
1	MICH	Shuttlesworth 1 yard run (Lantry kick)	MICH 14–0
1	MICH	Chapman 1 yard run (Lantry kick)	MICH 21–0
2	MICH	Lantry 50 yard field goal	MICH 24–0
2	MICH	Gustafson 4 yard pass from Franklin (Lantry kick)	MICH 31–0
2	MICH	Lantry 51 yard field goal	MICH 34–0
3	STAN	Garcia 37 yard field goal	MICH 34–3
3	MICH	Shuttlesworth 1 yard run (Lantry kick)	MICH 41–3
4	STAN	Ishman 19 yard pass from Boryla (Garcia kick)	MICH 41–10
4	MICH	Chapman 5 yard run (kick failed)	MICH 47–10

On September 22, 1973, Michigan defeated Stanford, 47–10, in front of a crowd of 80,177 at Michigan Stadium. Michigan took a 21–0 lead in the first quarter and led 34–0 at halftime. Dennis Franklin rushed for 49 yards and completed five of eight passes for 50 yards, including a four-yard touchdown pass in the second quarter. Mike Lantry broke Dana Coin's Michigan record with a 50-yard field goal in the second quarter; Lantry then broke his own record later in the quarter with a 51-yard field goal. The game was billed as revenge for Stanford's defeat of No. 3-ranked Michigan in the 1972 Rose Bowl. Chuck Heater scored Michigan's first touchdown, while Ed Shuttlesworth and Gil Chapman each scored two touchdowns. The Wolverines sacked Stanford quarterbacks Mike Boryla and Mike Cordova 11 times in the game. Stanford's only touchdown came on a 19-yard pass from Boryla to Reggie Ishman in the fourth quarter.

=== Navy ===
Team	1	2	3	4	Total
Navy	0	0	0	0	0
• Michigan	7	0	7	0	14

- Date: September 29
- Location: Michigan Stadium

Scoring summary
1	MICH	Heater 8-yard run (Lantry kick)	MICH 7–0
3	MICH	Shuttlesworth 1-yard run (Lantry kick)	MICH 14–0

On September 29, 1973, Michigan defeated Navy, 14–0, in front of a Band Day crowd of 88,042 at Michigan Stadium. Michigan's two touchdowns were scored by Chuck Heater on an eight-yard run in the first quarter and Ed Shuttlesworth on a one-yard run in the third quarter. Navy completed 17 of 30 passes for 173 yards and three interceptions, with a touchdown pass being deflected at the last second by Dave Brown. Navy out-gained Michigan with 320 yard of total offense to 285 for Michigan. Michigan completed only one pass for four yards on three attempts. After the game, Michigan coach Bo Schembechler complained that he "didn't see us block anybody", that his team "played the worst game I've ever coached in Michigan Stadium", and added, "I hope this is a humbling victory . . . if there is such a thing." Despite the shutout, Schembechler also ripped his defensive unit, complaining that they did not play pass defense and played "the worst game our defense has ever played in shutting anybody out."

=== Oregon ===
Team	1	2	3	4	Total
Oregon	0	0	0	0	0
• Michigan	0	14	0	10	24

- Date: October 6
- Location: Michigan Stadium

Scoring summary
2	Michigan	Bob Thornbladh 2-yard run (Mike Lantry kick)	Michigan 7–0
2	Michigan	Paul Seal 4-yard pass from Larry Cipa (Mike Lantry kick)	Michigan 14–0
4	Michigan	Gil Chapman 83-yard punt return (Mike Lantry kick)	Michigan 21–0
4	Michigan	Mike Lantry 39-yard field goal	Michigan 24–0

On October 6, 1973, Michigan defeated Oregon, 24–0, in front of a crowd of 81,113 at Michigan Stadium. With Dennis Franklin out of action due to a broken finger, Larry Cipa made his first career start at quarterback for Michigan. Michigan scored 14 points in the second quarter on a short run by Bob Thornbladh and a short pass from Cipa to Paul Seal. In the fourth quarter, Michigan padded its lead on an 83-yard punt return by Gil Chapman and a Mike Lantry field goal. Michigan totaled 183 rushing yards and 93 passing yards against the Ducks. Despite the 24-point margin of victory, the press viewed Michigan's performance as sluggish. Joe Falls, sports editor of the Detroit Free Press, wrote of the team: "It is sluggish on offense. It is making mistakes all over the place . . . This Michigan team isn't close to being the error-free Michigan teams we have come to know so well over these last four years."

=== At Michigan State ===
Michigan–Michigan State football rivalry

Team	1	2	3	4	Total
• Michigan	10	7	0	14	31
Michigan St	0	0	0	0	0

- Date: October 13
- Location: Spartan Stadium

Scoring summary
Q1	MICH	Brown 52-yard punt return (Lantry kick)	MICH 7–0
Q1	MICH	Lantry 35-yard field goal	MICH 10–0
Q2	MICH	Chapman 53-yard run (Lantry kick)	MICH 17–0
Q4	MICH	Seal 6-yard pass from Franklin (Lantry kick)	MICH 24–0
Q4	MICH	Shuttlesworth 2-yard run (Lantry kick)	MICH 31–0

On October 13, 1973, Michigan defeated Michigan State, 31–0, in a soaking rainstorm before a crowd of 78,263 at Spartan Stadium. It was the Wolverines' third consecutive shutout and their most one-sided victory over the Spartans since 1947. With the ball slippery due to the rain, Michigan recovered four Michigan State fumbles in the first quarter. Dave Brown scored Michigan's first touchdown on a 52-yard punt return. Gil Chapman scored on a 53-yard run around left end in the second quarter, and Michigan led 17–0 at halftime. In the third quarter, neither team scored as the rain became a "deluge". Michigan added two more touchdowns in the fourth quarter on a six-yard pass from Dennis Franklin to Paul Seal and a two-yard run by Ed Shuttlesworth. Mike Lantry kicked a 35-yard field goal and converted all four extra point attempts. Dennis Franklin played with a broken finger, leading coach Schembechler to praise his one-handed quarterback for "a helluva job." On defense, the Wolverines held the Spartans to 40 rushing yards on 37 carries. Linebacker Steve Strinko had nine tackles, four of them for a loss, and recovered a fumble.

=== Wisconsin ===
Team	1	2	3	4	Total
Wisconsin	0	0	0	6	6
• Michigan	7	14	7	7	35

- Date: October 20
- Location: Michigan Stadium

Scoring summary
1	MICH	Seal 46-yard pass from Franklin (Lantry kick)	Michigan 7–0
2	MICH	Chapman 3-yard run (Lantry kick)	Michigan 14–0
2	MICH	Franklin 1-yard run (Lantry kick)	Michigan 21–0
3	MICH	Heater 4-yard run (Lantry kick)	Michigan 28–0
4	WIS	Marek 65-yard pass from Bohlig (kick failed)	Michigan 28–6
4	MICH	Bell 7-yard run (Lantry kick)	Michigan 35–6

On October 20, 1973, Michigan defeated Wisconsin, 35–6, in front of a homecoming crowd of 87,723 at Michigan Stadium. With 108 passing yards and 415 rushing yards, the Wolverines tallied 523 yards of total offense. Michigan opened the scoring in the first quarter with a 46-yard touchdown pass from Dennis Franklin to Paul Seal. Michigan's remaining touchdowns were scored by Gil Chapman (three-yard run in second quarter), Franklin (one-yard run in second quarter), Chuck Heater (four-yard run in third quarter), and Gordon Bell (seven-yard run in fourth quarter). Mike Lantry converted all five extra point attempts. Michigan's shutout streak ended after 15 consecutive quarters when Wisconsin scored on a freak play as a deflected pass resulted in a 65-yard touchdown in the fourth quarter.

=== At Minnesota ===
Little Brown Jug

Team	1	2	3	4	Total
• Michigan	17	7	3	7	34
Minnesota	0	0	7	0	7

- Date: October 27
- Location: Memorial Stadium
- Game attendance: 44,435

Scoring summary
Q1	MICH	Lantry 27-yard field goal	MICH 3–0
Q1	MICH	Shuttlesworth 6-yard run (Lantry kick)	MICH 10–0
Q1	MICH	Shuttlesworth 1-yard run (Lantry kick)	MICH 17–0
Q2	MICH	Bell 2-yard run (Lantry kick)	MICH 24–0
Q3	MICH	Lantry 29-yard field goal	MICH 27–0
Q3	MINN	Fuller 36-yard pass from Upchurch (Goldberg kick)	MICH 27–7
Q4	MICH	Bell 1-yard run (Lantry kick)	MICH 34–7

On October 27, 1973, Michigan defeated Minnesota, 34–7, before a homecoming crowd of 44,435 at Memorial Stadium in Minneapolis. The victory was Michigan's sixth in a row in the annual battle for the Little Brown Jug. Michigan rushed for 275 yards led by Gordon Bell with 73 yards and Ed Shuttlesworth with 69 yards. Shuttlesworth and Bell scored two rushing touchdowns each, and Mike Lantry kicked field goals of 27 and 29 yards and converted all four extra point kicks. Michigan took a 17–0 lead in the first quarter, including 10 points off early turnovers. On the second play from scrimmage, a Minnesota fumble was recovered by Michigan (Doug Troszak) to set up Lantry's first field goal. On Minnesota's next play from scrimmage, the Gophers fumbled again with Dave Brown recovering to set up a six-yard touchdown run by Shuttlesworth. After Bell scored in the second quarter, Michigan led 24–0 at halftime without having thrown a single pass. In the third quarter, Minnesota quarterback Rick Upchurch (later an All-Pro wide receiver for the Denver Broncos) threw a touchdown pass to a wide open Vince Fuller. Minnesota coach Cal Stoll played eight men on the line, but Michigan's defense held Minnesota to 142 yards of total offense.

=== Indiana ===
Team	1	2	3	4	Total
Indiana	0	7	0	6	13
• Michigan	14	28	7	0	49

- Date: November 3
- Location: Michigan Stadium
- Game attendance: 76,432

Scoring summary
1	MICH	Heater 9-yard run (Lantry kick)	Michigan 7–0
1	MICH	Shuttlesworth 1-yard run (Lantry kick)	Michigan 14–0
2	MICH	Heater 71-yard run (Lantry kick)	Michigan 21–0
2	MICH	Bell 29-yard run (Lantry kick)	Michigan 28–0
2	MICH	Franklin 29-yard run (Lantry kick)	Michigan 35–0
2	MICH	Thornbladh 10-yard run (Lantry kick)	Michigan 42–0
2	IND	Smock 5-yard pass from Jones (Stavroff kick)	Michigan 42–7
3	MICH	Shuttlesworth 2-yard run (Lantry kick)	Michigan 49–7
4	IND	Cremeens 8-yard run (run failed)	Michigan 49–13

On November 3, 1973, Michigan defeated Indiana, 49–13, in front of 76,432 at Michigan Stadium. Michigan took a 42–0 lead in the second quarter before Indiana scored its first touchdown The Wolverines totaled 385 rushing yards and 96 passing yards. Chuck Heater was the game's leading rusher with 128 yards. After the game, Indiana coach Lee Corso praised both Michigan and Ohio State and predicted that the showdown between the two would be decided by a kicking mistake in the fourth quarter.

=== Illinois ===
Illinois–Michigan football series

Team	1	2	3	4	Total
Illinois	0	6	0	0	6
• Michigan	0	7	7	7	21

- Date: November 10
- Location: Michigan Stadium
- Game attendance: 76,461

Scoring summary
2	ILL	Beaver 41-yard field goal	Illinois 3–0
2	ILL	Beaver 29-yard field goal	Illinois 6–0
2	MICH	Shuttlesworth 1-yard run (Lantry kick)	Michigan 7–6
3	MICH	Chapman 33-yard run (Lantry kick)	Michigan 14–6
4	MICH	Seal 20-yard run (Lantry kick)	Michigan 21–6

On November 10, 1973, Michigan defeated Illinois, 21–6, in front of 76,461 at Michigan Stadium. Late in the first quarter, Michigan moved the ball to near midfield on a 25-yard run by Chuck Heater when an Irish Setter ran onto the field and delayed the game for several minutes. After the game, Bo Schembechler joked, "When you're on offense, everything is momentum. We're standing in the huddle watching that dog and there goes our momentum." Neither team scored in the first quarter, but Illinois took a 6–0 lead in the second quarter on two field goals by Dan Beaver, the second of which bounced off the left upright down onto the crossbar before falling across. Michigan took the lead late in the second quarter on a one-yard touchdown run by Ed Shuttlesworth. Michigan led, 7–6, at halftime.

On the opening drive of the second half, Gil Chapman scored on a 33-yard touchdown run off an option pitch from Dennis Franklin. In the fourth quarter, an option pitch by Franklin was deflected by Illinois. In the resulting scramble for the loose ball, Paul Seal recovered and ran 20 yards for a touchdown with Mike Hoban knocking over three Illini with a block to clear Seal's path. Mike Lantry converted all three extra point kicks for Michigan. In uncharacteristic form, the Wolverines fumbled six times in the game, resulting in four turnovers. After the game, coach Schembechler promised that he'd run the next guy who fumbled "til his tongue hangs out." Michigan's defense held the Illini to 52 yards of total offense in the second half.

=== At Purdue ===
Team	1	2	3	4	Total
• Michigan	0	6	14	14	34
Purdue	0	3	6	0	9

- Date: November 17
- Location: Ross–Ade Stadium, West Lafayette, IN
- Game attendance: 56,485

Scoring summary
Q2	MICH	Haslerig 41-yard pass from Franklin (kick missed)	MICH 6–0
Q2	PUR	Schmidt 27-yard field goal	MICH 6–3
Q3	MICH	Franklin 3-yard run (Lantry kick)	MICH 13–3
Q3	MICH	Franklin 12-yard run (Lantry kick)	MICH 20–3
Q3	PUR	Herrick 18-yard pass from Bobrowski (pass failed)	MICH 20–9
Q4	MICH	Thornbladh 1-yard run (Lantry kick)	MICH 27–9
Q4	MICH	Thornbladh 1-yard run (Lantry kick)	MICH 34–9

On November 17, 1973, Michigan defeated Purdue, 34–9, before a crowd of 56,485 at Ross–Ade Stadium in West Lafayette, Indiana. In a low-scoring first half, Michigan took the lead in the second quarter on a 41-yard touchdown pass from Dennis Franklin to Clint Haslerig, but Mike Lantry missed the extra point kick after the snap from center was bobbled. Purdue kicked a 27-yard field goal later in the quarter, and Michigan led 6–3 at halftime. In the second half, Michigan's running game dominated as Franklin scored on touchdown runs of three and 12 yards in the third quarter, Bob Thornbladh scored on a pair of touchdown runs in the fourth quarter. Lantry converted all four extra point kicks in the second half. Michigan rushed for 310 yards in the game, including 84 yards by Chuck Heater, 66 yards by Ed Shuttlesworth, 64 yards for Gordon Bell, and 57 yards for Franklin. Franklin also completed three of seven passes for 70 yards. Purdue scored late in third quarter on an 18-yard pass from Bo Bobrowski to Herrick. Michigan's defense held Purdue to 119 yards (100 rushing and 19 passing).

On the same afternoon, Ohio State defeated Iowa, 55–13, as Archie Griffin broke the Buckeyes' single game record with 246 rushing yards. The victories by Michigan and Ohio State left both teams undefeated with the winner of the following week's rivalry match advancing to the Rose Bowl.

=== Ohio State ===
Michigan–Ohio State football rivalry

Team	1	2	3	4	Total
Ohio St	0	10	0	0	10
Michigan	0	0	0	10	10

- Date: November 23
- Location: Michigan Stadium
- Game attendance: 105,223
- Referee: Gene Calhoun (Big Ten)
- TV announcers (ABC): Chris Schenkel, Duffy Daugherty

Scoring summary
2		OHST	Blair Conway 31-yard field goal	OHST 3–0
2		OHST	Pete Johnson 5-yard run (Blair Conway kick)	OHST 10–0
4		MICH	Mike Lantry 30-yard field goal	OHST 10–3
4	9:32	MICH	Dennis Franklin 10-yard run (Mike Lantry kick)	Tied 10–10

On November 24, 1973, #4 Michigan and #1 Ohio State played to a 10–10 tie before a crowd of 105,223 at Michigan Stadium. Ohio State scored 10 points in the second quarter on a 31-yard field goal by Blair Conway and a five-yard touchdown run by fullback Pete Johnson. Michigan scored 10 point in the fourth quarter on a 30-yard field goal by Mike Lantry and a 10-yard touchdown run by Dennis Franklin. Franklin sustained a broken collarbone late in the fourth quarter. Michigan had 303 yards of total offense (204 rushing, 99 passing) to 234 yards (234 rushing and zero passing) for Ohio State. Archie Griffin rushed for 163 of Ohio State's 234 yards of total offense. Ed Shuttlesworth rushed for 116 yards for Michigan.

=== Rose Bowl controversy ===
With the Michigan–Ohio State game ending in a tie, Michigan and Ohio State tied for the Big Ten Conference championship with Michigan at 10–0–1 and Ohio State at 9–0–1. Under a conference rule, the conference's berth to the 1974 Rose Bowl was decided by a vote of the conference's athletic directors. Ohio State won the vote with six of ten athletic directors voting to send the Buckeyes to Pasadena. The injury to Michigan's starting quarterback Dennis Franklin was reported to be a significant factor in the vote of several athletic directors. The vote spawned a controversy, including public comments by the following:

- Coach Schemechler blamed conference commissioner Wayne Duke for engineering the vote and vowed, "I'm not going to let this drop. I'm going to get him." On being told that Duke had opened an investigation into Schembechler's alleged unsportsmanlike conduct which could result in the conference stripping Michigan of bowl privileges, Schembechler joked, "They already did that . . . that'd be double jeopardy."
- Former Michigan football player Gerald Ford, in one of his first public comments after taking office as Vice President of the United States (Ford was sworn in on December 6, 1973), criticized the Big Ten's decision saying, "On the basis of that game with Ohio State, Michigan should have gone. Look at the statistics. Michigan was the better team in that game. Michigan won the first, third and fourth quarters and Ohio State won the second. Look at the records, Michigan won 10 games and Ohio State won nine and each had a tie."
- A lawsuit was filed in federal court by a University of Michigan graduate student seeking an injunction requiring the Big Ten to conduct a new, public vote on which team should participate in the Rose Bowl. The University of Michigan refused to join the suit, and its athletic director Don Canham called the suit "ridiculous", while its faculty representative Marcus Plant called it "frivolous". The federal judge assigned to the case denied the plaintiff's request for an injunction.
- In Washington, D.C., Congressman Marvin Esch told the House of Representatives he wanted "a full explanation as to the method of selection."
- Michigan State athletic director Burt Smith, who reportedly cast the deciding vote for Ohio State, drew angry comments from Michigan legislators. Representative Loren Anderson announced that the legislature might respond by denying Michigan State University's application for a new law school. Other legislators said "the appropriations committee ought to scrutinize MSU's budget request a little closer next time around." A Michigan State spokesman stated that Smith had voted for the team with the best chance of winning the [Rose Bowl] game," and Smith himself stated that "no team dominated Michigan State the way Ohio State did." On January 1, 1974, Ohio State beat USC, 42–21. (In fact, Michigan State did not get a law school until nearly a quarter of a century later when the Detroit College of Law became the Michigan State University College of Law).

=== Post-season ===
Michigan's undefeated season in 1973 was its first since 1948.

At the end of the season, Paul Seal was voted as the recipient of the team's most valuable player award, then known as the Louis B. Hyde Memorial Award. At six feet, six inches, Seal caught only 14 passes for 253 yards, but he was described by Michigan coaches as "the best blocking tight end ever to wear the maize and blue."

Four Michigan players received recognition on the 1973 College Football All-America Team. They were:

- Defensive tackle Dave Gallagher was recognized as a consensus All-American, receiving first-team honors from the Associated Press (AP), the American Football Coaches Association (AFCA), the Football Writers Association of America (FWAA), the Newspaper Enterprise Association, the Walter Camp Football Foundation, The Sporting News, and Time magazine.
- Defensive back Dave Brown was also recognized as a consensus All-American, receiving first-team honors from the AFCA, FWAA, and the United Press International (UPI).
- Mike Lantry was selected by Football News as a first-team All-American as "the nation's top placekicker".
- Paul Seal was selected by the UPI as the second-team tight end on its All-America team.

Fifteen Michigan players received honors from either the AP or UPI on their 1973 All-Big Ten Conference football teams. They Michigan honorees were: Dave Brown (AP-1, UPI-1), Dennis Franklin (AP-1, UPI-1), Dave Gallagher (AP-1, UPI-1), Mike Hoban (AP-1, UPI-1), Ed Shuttlesworth (AP-1, UPI-1), Clint Haslerig (UPI-1), Jim Coode (AP-2, UPI-2), Paul Seal (AP-2, UPI-2), Gil Chapman (UPI-2), Don Coleman (UPI-2), Gary Hainrihar (UPI-2), Chuck Heater (AP-2), Steve Strinko (AP-2), Donald R. Warner (UPI-2), Walt Williamson (AP-2)

Two days after the Ohio State game, Michigan assistant coach Frank Maloney was hired as the head coach at Syracuse when Ben Schwartzwalder retired following 25 seasons with the Orangemen. Tom Reed, who had played for Schembechler at Miami (Ohio), was hired to replace Maloney.

On January 3, 1974, the final AP Poll rankings were announced. Notre Dame took the No. 1 spot, edging Ohio State, which had dropped out of the No. 1 spot after playing to a tie against Michigan. Michigan, which sat idle despite its undefeated record, dropped from the No. 5 spot to No. 6 spot, as Penn State rose to No. 5 after defeating LSU in the Orange Bowl. Two other selectors, the National Championship Foundation and the Poling System, recognize Michigan as a co-national champion for the 1973 season.

On January 6, 1974, Schembechler coached the East team to a 24–14 win in the Hula Bowl. Ed Shuttlesworth rushed for 88 yards on 22 carries for the East squad.

== Personnel ==
=== Roster ===
1973 Michigan Wolverines football team roster
Players
Coaches
**Offense**

Pos.	#	Name	Class
G	58	James Armour	Sr
RB	5	Gordon Bell	So
RB	19	Jon Cederberg	Sr
TB	24	Gil Chapman	Jr
OT	70	John Cherry	Sr
QB	13	Larry Cipa	Sr
OT	73	Jim Coode	Jr
C	52	James Czirr	So
TE	84	Greg DenBoer	Jr
TE	89	Arthur Fediuk	Sr
QB	9	Dennis Franklin	Jr
C	50	Dennis Franks	Jr
WR	48	Larry Gustafson	Sr
G	69	Gary Hainrihar	Sr
WR	43	Clint Haslerig	Sr
RB	44	Chuck Heater	Jr
OT	93	Bill Hoban	Sr
G	61	Mike Hoban	Sr
C	51	Thomas Jensen	Jr
WR	27	Keith Johnson	So
WR	82	Larry Johnson	Sr
OT	67	Steven King	Jr
OT	74	Kirk Lewis	So
G	65	David Metz	Jr
TE	80	George Przygodski	So
TE	83	Paul Seal	Sr
FB	31	Ed Shuttlesworth	Sr
QB	17	Tom Slade	Sr
WR	3	Jim Smith	Fr
WR	23	Ronald Szydlowski	Sr
C	66	John Thomas	Sr
FB	30	Bob Thornbladh	Sr
OT	75	Douglas Troszak	Sr
OT	78	Curtis Tucker	Sr
OT	64	Pat Tumpane	Jr

**Defense**

Pos.	#	Name	Class
DE	85	Dave Brandon	Sr
S	6	Dave Brown	Sr
DB	8	Roy Burks	Jr
DE	39	Don Coleman	Sr
DT	56	Tim Davis	So
LB	57	Michael Day	Sr
DB	25	Barry Dotzauer	Sr
DB	28	Thomas Drake	Jr
DB	35	Don Dufek	So
DE	86	Donald Eaton	Sr
DB	45	Dave Elliott	Jr
DT	81	Dave Gallagher	Sr
DE	81	Dan Jilek	So
S	10	Gregory Koss	Sr
DT	70	Jim Lyall	Sr
LB	34	Craig Mutch	Sr
DT	97	Jeff Perlinger	Jr
LB	33	Carl Russ	So
DB	38	Geoffrey Steger	Jr
LB	59	Steve Strinko	So
LB	46	Jovan Vercel	Sr
MG	54	Donald Warner	Sr
DE	91	Walter Williamson	Sr

**Special teams**

Pos.	#	Name	Class
PK	36	Mike Lantry	Jr

Head coach

- Bo Schembechler

Coordinators/assistant coaches

Legend

- **(C)** Team captain
- **(S)** Suspended
- **(I)** Ineligible
- Injured
- Redshirt

Roster

=== Offensive letter winners ===
The following players won varsity letters for their participation on the team's offensive unit. Players who were starters in at least half of the team's games, or who started the most games at a position, are shown with their names in bold.

- James Armour, offensive guard, senior, Detroit, Michigan
- Gordon Bell, tailback, sophomore, Troy, Ohio
- Jon Cederberg, tailback, senior, Plymouth, Michigan
- Gil Chapman, wing back, junior, Elizabeth, New Jersey – started 3 games at tailback
- John A. Cherry, offensive tackle, senior, Willard, Ohio
- Larry Cipa, quarterback, senior, Cincinnati, Ohio – started 1 game at quarterback
- **Jim Coode**, offensive tackle, junior, Mayfield Heights, Ohio – started 9 games at right tackle
- James C. Czirr, center, sophomore, St. Joseph, Michigan – started 2 games at center
- Greg DenBoer, tight end, junior, Kentwood, Michigan
- Arthur W. Fediuk, tight end, senior, Livonia, Michigan
- **Dennis Franklin**, quarterback, junior, Massillon, Ohio – started 10 games at quarterback
- **Dennis Franks**, center, junior, Bethel Park, Pennsylvania – started 5 games at center
- Larry Gustafson, wing back, senior, Mays Landing, New Jersey
- Gary Hainrihar, offensive guard, senior, Cicero, Illinois – started 3 games at right guard, 2 games at left guard
- **Clint Haslerig**, wing back, senior, Cincinnati, Ohio – started all 11 games at wing back
- **Chuck Heater**, tailback, junior, Tiffin, Ohio – started 8 games at tailback
- **Bill Hoban**, offensive tackle, senior, Chicago, Illinois – started 7 games at left guard
- Mike Hoban, offensive guard, junior, Chicago, Illinois
- Thomas P. Jensen, center, junior, Springfield, Illinois – started 4 games at center
- Keith Johnson, split end, sophomore, Munster, Indiana
- **Larry L. Johnson**, defensive end, senior, Munster, Indiana – started all 11 games at split end
- R. Steven King, offensive tackle, junior, Tiffin, Ohio
- Mike Lantry, place-kicker, junior, Oxford, Michigan
- Kirk Lewis, offensive tackle, sophomore, Garden City, Michigan – started 2 games at right guard, 1 game at left guard
- **David F. Metz**, offensive guard, junior, Harrison, Ohio – started 6 games at right guard, 1 game at left guard
- George Przygodski, tight end, sophomore, Grand Rapids, Michigan
- **Paul Seal**, tight end, senior, Detroit, Michigan – started all 11 games at tight end
- **Ed Shuttlesworth**, fullback, senior, Cincinnati, Ohio – started all 11 games at fullback
- Tom Slade, quarterback, senior, Saginaw, Michigan
- Jim Smith, end, freshman, Blue Island, Illinois
- Ronald Szydlowski, wing back, senior, Wyandotte, Michigan
- John E. Thomas, center, senior, Detroit, Michigan
- Bob Thornbladh, fullback, senior, Plymouth, Michigan
- Douglas Troszak, offensive tackle, senior, Warren, Michigan
- **Curtis Tucker**, offensive tackle, senior, Cleveland, Ohio – started all 11 games at left tackle
- Pat Tumpane, offensive tackle, junior, Midlothian, Illinois – started 2 games at right tackle

=== Defensive letter winners ===
The following players won varsity letters for their participation on the team's defensive unit. Players who were starters in at least half of the team's games are shown with their names in bold.

- Dave Brandon, defensive end, senior, Plymouth, Michigan
- **Dave Brown**, safety, junior, Akron, Ohio – started all 11 games at safety
- Roy W. Burks, defensive back, junior, Midland, Michigan
- **Don Coleman**, defensive end, senior, Daly City, Ohio – started all 11 games at right defensive end
- **Tim Davis**, middle guard, sophomore, Warren, Ohio – started 7 games at middle guard
- Michael J. Day, linebacker, senior, Livonia, Michigan
- **Barry Dotzauer**, defensive back, senior, Cincinnati, Ohio – started 10 games at weak-side defensive halfback
- Thomas E. Drake, defensive back, junior, Midland, Michigan – started 1 game at weak-side defensive halfback
- **Don Dufek**, wolfman, sophomore, East Grand Rapids, Michigan – started all 11 games at wolfman
- Donald R. Eaton, defensive end, senior, Lancaster, Ohio
- **Dave Elliott**, defensive back, junior, Coral Gables, Florida – started all 11 games at strong-side defensive halfback
- **Dave Gallagher**, defensive tackle, senior, Piqua, Ohio – started all 11 games at right defensive tackle
- Dan Jilek, defensive end, sophomore, Sterling Heights, Michigan
- Gregory Koss, safety, senior, Cuyahoga Falls, Ohio
- James M. Lyall, defensive tackle, senior, North Olmstead, Ohio
- Craig A. Mutch, linebacker, senior, Detroit
- Jeff Perlinger, offensive tackle, junior, Crystal, Minnesota – started 1 game at left defensive tackle
- **Carl Russ**, linebacker, sophomore, Muskegon Heights, Michigan – started all 11 games at w. linebacker
- Geoffrey Steger, wolf, junior, Winnetka, Illinois
- **Steve Strinko**, linebacker, sophomore, Middletown, Ohio – started all 11 games at middle linebacker
- **Douglas Troszak**, defensive tackle, senior, Warren, Michigan – started 10 games at defensive left tackle
- Jovan Vercel, linebacker, senior, Highland, Indiana
- Donald R. Warner, middle guard, senior, Dearborn, Michigan – started 4 games at middle guard
- **Walter Williamson**, defensive end, senior, Detroit, Michigan – started all 11 games at left defensive end

=== Other players ===
The following players did not win varsity letters, but participated as backups or as members of the junior varsity (JV) or all freshman (AF) teams.

- Harry Banks, tailback, senior, Cleveland, Ohio
- Jim Bolden, tailback, freshman (JV), Akron, Ohio
- Kevin Casey, quarterback, senior, Grand Rapids, Michigan
- Jim Hackett, linebacker, freshman (JV), London, Ohio
- Rob Lytle, tailback (JV), freshman, Fremont, Ohio
- Les Miles, offensive guard, sophomore, Elyria, Ohio
- Calvin O'Neal, linebacker, sophomore, Saginaw, Michigan

== Awards and honors ==
- All-Americans: Dave Brown (consensus), Dave Gallagher (consensus), Mike Lantry (Football News), Paul Seal (UPI-2)
- All-Conference: Dave Brown (AP-1, UPI-1), Dennis Franklin (AP-1, UPI-1), Dave Gallagher (AP-1, UPI-1), Mike Hoban (AP-1, UPI-1), Ed Shuttlesworth (AP-1, UPI-1), Clint Haslerig (UPI-1), Jim Coode (AP-2, UPI-2), Paul Seal (AP-2, UPI-2), Gil Chapman (UPI-2), Don Coleman (UPI-2), Gary Hainrihar (UPI-2), Chuck Heater (AP-2), Steve Strinko (AP-2), Donald R. Warner (UPI-2), Walt Williamson (AP-2)
- Most Valuable Player: Paul Seal
- Meyer Morton Award: Paul Seal
- John Maulbetsch Award: Don Dufek
- Frederick Matthei Award: Dave Brown
- Arthur Robinson Scholarship Award: Don Warner

== Statistical leaders ==
The following players were Michigan's statistical leaders for the 1973 season.

=== Rushing ===
Player	Attempts	Net yards	Yards per attempt	Touchdowns	Long
Ed Shuttlesworth	193	745	3.9	9	15
Chuck Heater	114	666	5.8	6	71
Gil Chapman	111	542	4.9	6	53
Gordon Bell	88	475	5.3	4	24
Dennis Franklin	101	425	4.2	6	49
Bob Thornbladh	52	206	4.0	5	31

=== Passing ===
Player	Attempts	Completions	Interceptions	Comp %	Yards	Yds/Comp	TD	Long
Dennis Franklin	67	36	5	53.7	534	14.8	4	46
Larry Cipa	35	13	2	37.1	163	12.5	1	36

=== Receiving ===
Player	Receptions	Yards	Yds/Recp	TD	Long
Paul Seal	14	254	18.1	3	46
Clint Haslerig	13	210	16.1	1	41
Keith Johnson	9	108	12.0	0	19

=== Kickoff returns ===
Player	Returns	Yards	Yds/Return	TD	Long
Gil Chapman	6	133	22.2	0	28
Clint Haslerig	6	127	21.2	0	31
Chuck Heater	4	84	21.0	0	28

=== Punt returns ===
Player	Returns	Yards	Yds/Return	TD	Long
Gil Chapman	13	179	13.8	1	83
Tom Drake	9	139	15.4	0	54
David Brown	14	125	8.9	1	53

=== Tackles ===
Player	Tac	Ast	Tot	PBU	FR
Steve Strinko	77	31	108	1	2
Carl Russ	40	26	66	3	1
Dave Gallagher	37	22	59	9	1
David Brown	39	16	55	3	1
Don Dufek	38	17	55	5	1

== Coaching staff ==
- Head coach: Bo Schembechler
- Assistant coaches: Dennis Brown, Tirrel Burton, Jerry Hanlon, Jack Harbaugh, Frank Maloney, George Mans, Gary Moeller, Chuck Stobart, Elliot Uzelac
- Trainer: Lindsy McLean
- Manager: James T. Bueter

== NFL draft ==
In the 1974 NFL draft, held on January 29 and 30, 1974, the following Michigan players were selected.

Round #	Pick #	NFL team	Player	Position
1	20	Chicago Bears	Dave Gallagher	Defensive tackle
2	36	New Orleans Saints	Paul Seal	Tight end
2	37	Baltimore Colts	Ed Shuttlesworth	Running back
4	83	San Francisco 49ers	Clint Haslerig	Wide receiver
7	173	Atlanta Falcons	Jim Coode	Offensive tackle
10	246	Green Bay Packers	Doug Troszak	Defensive tackle
11	275	Kansas City Chiefs	Bob Thornbladh	Running back
14	347	San Francisco 49ers	Walt Williamson	Defensive end
15	373	New Orleans Saints	Larry Cipa	Quarterback
16	398	New Orleans Saints	Don Coleman	Linebacker
