= 1973 in Michigan =

- Decades: 1950s; 1960s; 1970s; 1980s; 1990s
- See also: History of Michigan; Historical outline of Michigan; List of years in Michigan; 1973 in the United States

Events from the year 1973 in Michigan.

The Associated Press (AP) selected the top news stories for 1973 in Michigan as follows:

1. The selection of Michigan Congressman Gerald Ford as Vice President of the United States following the resignation of Spiro Agnew;
2. The 1973 oil crisis;
3. Layoffs in the automobile industry following a drop in sales;
4. Negotiations between the United Auto Workers and the Big Three automobile manufacturers;
5. Coleman Young's election victory on November 6 over former police commissioner John F. Nichols to become the first African-American Mayor of Detroit;
6. (tie) The Michigan State Lottery earned $61 million in its first full year;
7. (tie) Natural gas forced residents to evacuate their homes in Williamsburg, Michigan;
8. Severe winter storms struck the state in March;
9. Union construction workers protested at nonunion work sites in Kalkaska and Midland; and
10. Col. William Nolde of Michigan was the last American soldier to die in combat in the Vietnam War; he was killed on January 27 when artillery blew up his bunker 11 hours before the ceasefire.

The AP also chose the state's top sports stories as follows:

1. The 1973 Michigan Wolverines football team's being passed over for the 1974 Rose Bowl despite its undefeated season and playing Ohio State to a 10–10 tie on November 24;
2. John Hiller's comeback from a heart attack to set a major league record with 34 saves;
3. Gordie Howe signing a contract on June 19 to play with his sons for the Houston Aeros of the World Hockey Association;
4. The Saginaw Arthur Hill High School football team compiling an undefeated season and outscoring opponents, 443–0;
5. The September 2 firing of Billy Martin as manager of the Detroit Tigers;
6. Joe Schmidt's January 12 resignation as head coach of the Detroit Lions;
7. The hiring of Alex Delvecchio as general manager of the Detroit Red Wings and the firing of Ted Garvin as coach;
8. The rise of girls' athletics in the state, including Carolyn King playing for a boys' Little League team in Ypsilanti;
9. The October 11 hiring of Ralph Houk as the new manager of the Detroit Tigers; and
10. The firing of Johnny Wilson as head coach of the Detroit Red Wings and the naming of Ted Garvin as coach.

== Office holders ==
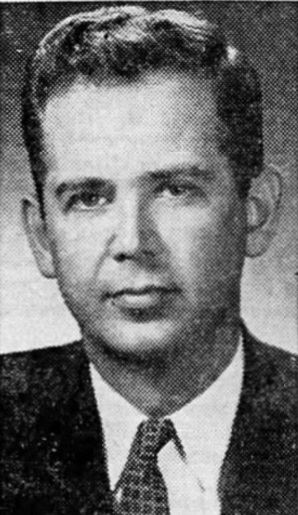
Gov. Milliken

=== State office holders ===
- Governor of Michigan: William Milliken (Republican)
- Lieutenant Governor of Michigan: James H. Brickley (Republican)
- Michigan Attorney General: Frank J. Kelley (Democrat)
- Michigan Secretary of State: Richard H. Austin (Democrat)
- Speaker of the Michigan House of Representatives: William A. Ryan (Democrat)
- Majority Leader of the Michigan Senate: Robert VanderLaan (Republican)
- Chief Justice, Michigan Supreme Court:

=== Mayors of major cities ===
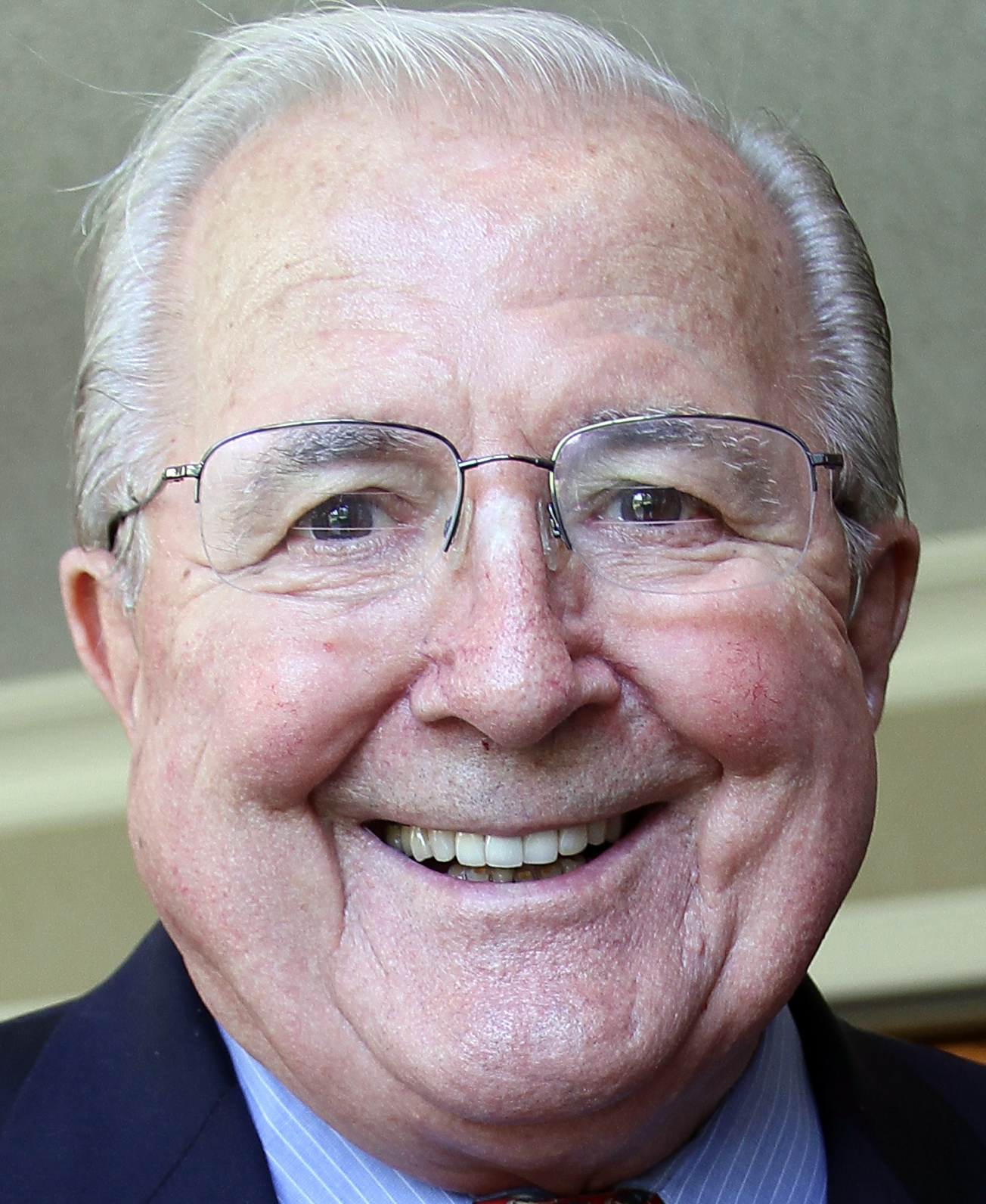
Mayor Gribbs

- Mayor of Detroit: Roman Gribbs
- Mayor of Grand Rapids: Lyman S. Parks
- Mayor of Flint: Francis E. Limmer/Paul Calvin Visser
- Mayor of Warren, Michigan: Ted Bates
- Mayor of Sterling Heights, Michigan: Al Martin
- Mayor of Lansing: Gerald W. Graves
- Mayor of Dearborn: Orville L. Hubbard
- Mayor of Ann Arbor: Robert J. Harris (Democrat) / James E. Stephenson (Republican)
- Mayor of Saginaw: Paul H. Wendler/William F. Nelson, Jr.

=== Federal office holders ===
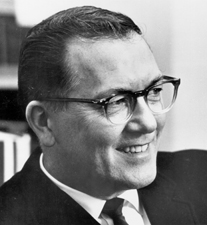
Sen. Griffin

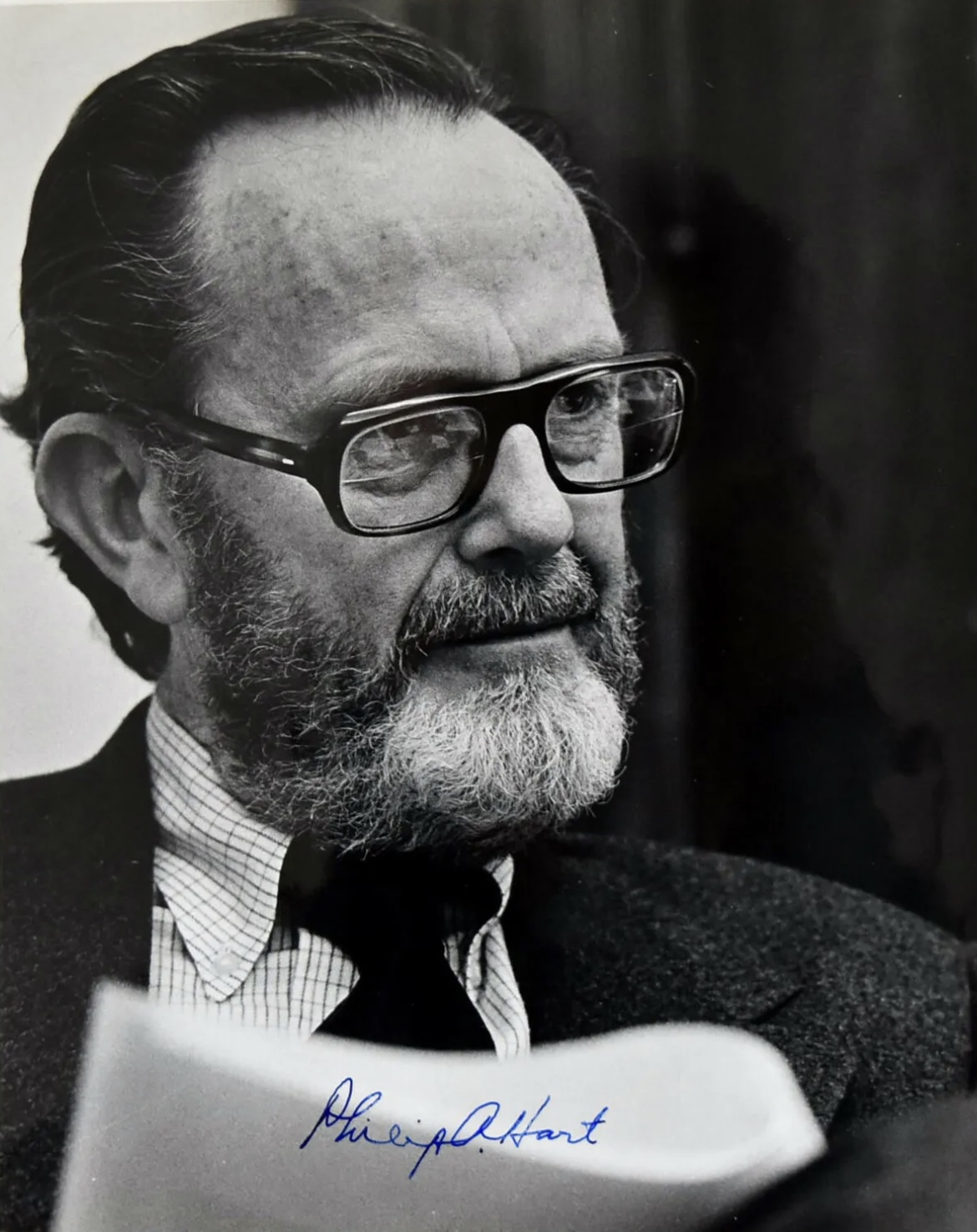
Sen. Hart

- U.S. Senator from Michigan: Robert P. Griffin (Republican)
- U.S. Senator from Michigan: Philip Hart (Democrat)
- House District 1: John Conyers (Democrat)
- House District 2: Marvin L. Esch (Republican)
- House District 3: Garry E. Brown (Republican)
- House District 4: J. Edward Hutchinson (Republican)
- House District 5: Gerald Ford (Republican)
- House District 6: Charles E. Chamberlain (Republican)
- House District 7: Donald W. Riegle Jr. (Republican)
- House District 8: R. James Harvey (Republican)
- House District 9: Guy Vander Jagt (Republican)
- House District 10: Elford Albin Cederberg (Republican)
- House District 11: Philip Ruppe (Republican)
- House District 12: James G. O'Hara (Democrat)
- House District 13: Charles Diggs (Democrat)
- House District 14: Lucien N. Nedzi (Democrat)
- House District 15: William D. Ford (Democrat)
- House District 16: John Dingell Jr. (Democrat)
- House District 17: Martha Griffiths (Democrat)
- House District 18: William Broomfield (Republican)
- House District 19: Jack H. McDonald (Republican)

== Population ==
In the 1970 United States census, Michigan was recorded as having a population of 8,875,083 persons, ranking as the seventh most populous state in the country. By 1980, the state's population had grown 4.4% to 9,262,078 persons.

=== Cities ===
The following is a list of cities in Michigan with a population of at least 70,000 based on 1970 U.S. Census data. Historic census data from 1960 and 1980 is included to reflect trends in population increases or decreases. Cities that are part of the Detroit metropolitan area are shaded in tan.

1970 Rank	City	County	1960 Pop.	1970 Pop.	1980 Pop.	Change 1970-80
1	Detroit	Wayne	1,670,144	1,514,063	1,203,368	−20.5% ▼
2	Grand Rapids	Kent	177,313	197,649	181,843	−8.0% ▼
3	Flint	Genesee	196,940	193,317	159,611	−17.4% ▼
4	Warren	Macomb	89,246	179,260	161,134	−10.1% ▼
5	Lansing	Ingham	107,807	131,403	130,414	−0.8% ▼
6	Livonia	Wayne	66,702	110,109	104,814	−4.8% ▼
7	Dearborn	Wayne	112,007	104,199	90,660	−13.0% ▼
8	Ann Arbor	Washtenaw	67,340	100,035	107,969	7.9% ▲
9	Saginaw	Saginaw	98,265	91,849	77,508	−15.6% ▼
10	St. Clair Shores	Macomb	76,657	88,093	76,210	−13.5% ▼
11	Westland	Wayne	60,743	86,749	84,603	−2.5% ▼
12	Royal Oak	Oakland	80,612	86,238	70,893	−17.8% ▼
13	Kalamazoo	Kalamazoo	82,089	85,555	79,722	−6.8% ▼
14	Pontiac	Oakland	82,233	85,279	76,715	−10.0% ▼
15	Dearborn Heights	Wayne	61,118	80,069	67,706	−15.4% ▼
16	Taylor	Wayne	na	70,020	77,568	10.8% ▲

=== Counties ===
The following is a list of counties in Michigan with populations of at least 120,000 based on 1970 U.S. Census data. Historic census data from 1960 and 1980 are included to reflect trends in population increases or decreases. Counties that are part of the Detroit metropolitan area are shaded in tan.

1970 Rank	County	Largest city	1960 Pop.	1970 Pop.	1980 Pop.	Change 1970-80
1	Wayne	Detroit	2,666,297	2,666,751	2,337,891	−12.3% ▼
2	Oakland	Pontiac	690,259	907,871	1,011,793	11.4% ▲
3	Macomb	Warren	405,804	625,309	694,600	11.1% ▲
4	Genesee	Flint	374,313	444,341	450,449	1.4% ▲
5	Kent	Grand Rapids	363,187	411,044	444,506	8.1% ▲
6	Ingham	Lansing	211,296	261,039	275,520	5.5% ▲
7	Washtenaw	Ann Arbor	172,440	234,103	264,748	13.1% ▲
8	Saginaw	Saginaw	190,752	219,743	228,059	3.8% ▲
9	Kalamazoo	Kalamazoo	169,712	201,550	212,378	5.4% ▲
10	Berrien	Benton Harbor	149,865	163,875	171,276	4.5% ▲
11	Muskegon	Muskegon	129,943	157,426	157,589	0.1% ▲
12	Jackson	Jackson	131,994	143,274	151,495	5.7% ▲
13	Calhoun	Battle Creek	138,858	141,963	141,557	−0.3% ▼
14	Ottawa	Holland	98,719	128,181	157,174	22.6% ▲
15	St. Clair	Port Huron	107,201	120,175	138,802	15.5% ▲
16	Monroe	Monroe	101,120	118,479	134,659	13.7% ▲
17	Bay	Bay City	107,042	117,339	119,881	2.2% ▲

== Sports ==
=== Baseball ===
- 1973 Detroit Tigers season – Under managers Billy Martin and Joe Schultz, the Tigers compiled an 85–77 record and finished third in the American League East. The team's statistical leaders included Willie Horton with a .316 batting average, Norm Cash with 19 home runs, Aurelio Rodriguez with 58 RBIs, Joe Coleman with 23 wins, and John Hiller with a 1.44 earned run average.

=== American football ===
- 1973 Detroit Lions season – The Lions, under head coach Don McCafferty, compiled a 6–7–1 record and finished in second place in the NFL's Central Division. The team's statistical leaders included Bill Munson with 1,129 passing yards, Altie Taylor with 719 rushing yards, Charlie Sanders with 433 receiving yards, and Errol Mann with 53 points scored.
- 1973 Michigan Wolverines football team – Under head coach Bo Schembechler, the Wolverines compiled a 10–0–1 record, tying with Ohio State in the final game of the season. The Wolverines were ranked No. 6 in the final AP Poll. The team's statistical leaders included Dennis Franklin with 534 passing yards, Ed Shuttlesworth with 745 rushing yards and 78 points scored, and Paul Seal with 254 receiving yards.

=== Basketball ===
- 1972–73 Detroit Pistons season – Under head coaches Earl Lloyd and Ray Scott, the Pistons compiled a 40–42 record and finished third in the NBA's Midwest Division. The team's statistical leaders included Bob Lanier with 1,927 points and 1,205 rebounds and Dave Bing with 637 assists.
- 1972–73 Michigan Wolverines men's basketball team – Under head coach Johnny Orr, the Wolverines compiled a 13–11 record and finished sixth in the Big Ten Conference. The team's statistical leaders included Henry Wilmore with 523 points and Campy Russell with 231 rebounds.

=== Ice hockey ===
- 1972–73 Detroit Red Wings season – Under head coach Johnny Wilson, the Red Wings compiled a 37–29–10 record and finished fifth in the National Hockey League's East Division. The team's statistical leaders included Mickey Redmond with 52 goals and 93 points scored and Alex Delvecchio with 53 assists. The team's regular goaltenders were Roy Edwards and Denis DeJordy.

=== Golf ===
- Buick Open –
- Michigan Open –

=== Boat racing ===
- Port Huron to Mackinac Boat Race –
- Spirit of Detroit race –
- APBA Gold Cup –

=== Other ===
- 1972 NCAA Indoor Track and Field Championships –
- Yankee 600 -

== Music ==
Albums and singles by Michigan artists or centered on Michigan topics that were released or became hits in 1973 include the following:

- Detroit native Diana Ross had a big year. Her single, "Touch Me in the Morning", released in May 1973, reached No. 1 on the Billboard Hot 100 and was ranked No. 10 on the Billboard Year-End Hot 100 singles of 1973. The album Touch Me in the Morning was released in June and reached No. 5 on the Billboard album chart. Ross had two other album releases in 1973. Diana & Marvin, a duet album with Marvin Gaye, was released in October and reached No. 26 on the album chart. It included the single "You're a Special Part of Me" that reached No. 12 on the Hot 100. A third album from Ross, Last Time I Saw Him, was released in December 1973.
- Stevie Wonder, who was born in Saginaw and raised in Detroit, scored three of the year's biggest hits. "You Are the Sunshine of My Life, released in April 1973, reached No. 1 on the Billboard Hot 100, and was ranked No. 19 on the Billboard Year-End Hot 100 singles of 1973. "Superstition", released in October 1972, also reached No. 1 on the Hot 100, and was ranked No. 19 on the 1973 year-end singles list. "Higher Ground", released in July 1973, reached No. 4 on the Hot 100, and was ranked No. 62 on year-end singles list.
- Flint's Grand Funk Railroad had a breakout year. The album We're an American Band was released in July 1973 and reached No. 2 on the Billboard album chart. The single "We're an American Band" reached No. 1 on the Hot 100 and was ranked No. 23 on the Billboard Year-End Hot 100 singles of 1973.
- The Spinners, from Ferndale, Michigan, also had a big year. Their single, "Could It Be I'm Falling in Love" was released in December 1972, reached No. 1 on the Hot 100, and was ranked No. 47 on the Billboard's 1973 year-end singles list. The follow-up album, Spinners, was released in April 1973 and reached No. 1 on the R&B album chart. The single "One of a Kind (Love Affair)" reached No. 11 on the Billboard Hot 100 and was ranked No. 82 on the 1973 year-end singles list.
- The Temptations released two albums in 1973: Masterpiece in February 1973 (No. 7 on the Billboard album chart); and 1990 in December 1973 (No. 19 on the album chart). The Temptations also had two hit singles: "Masterpiece", released in February 1973, reached No. 7 on the Hot 100, and was ranked No. 80 on the Billboard year-end list for 1973. "Papa Was a Rollin' Stone", released in September 1972, reached No. 1 on the Hot 100, and was ranked No. 100 on the 1973 year-end list.
- "Ain't No Woman (Like the One I've Got)", a single from The Four Tops, was released in January 1973, reached No. 4 on the Billboard Hot 100, and was ranked No. 60 on the Billboard Year-End Hot 100 singles of 1973.
- "Panic in Detroit" by David Bowie was released in April 1973.
- Raw Power, an album by Ann Arbor's The Stooges, was released in February 1973. It included the song "Search and Destroy".
- Hey Now Hey (The Other Side of the Sky), an album from Aretha Franklin, was released in June 1973. The album included two songs that went to No. 1 on the R&B chart: "Angel" and "Until You Come Back to Me (That's What I'm Gonna Do)".
- Back in '72, an album from Bob Seger, was released in January 1973. It included the song "Turn the Page".

== Chronology of events ==
=== March ===
- March 5 - Pizza manufacturer Mario Fabbrini publicly disposes of 29,188 frozen cheese-and-mushroom pizzas after a recall from the Food and Drug Administration, dubbed the Great Michigan Pizza Funeral.

== Births ==
- January 20 - Jalen Rose, basketball player, in Detroit
- February 21 - Brian Rolston, hockey player, in Flint, Michigan
- March 1 - Chris Webber, basketball player, in Detroit
- October 2 - Proof, rapper, in Detroit
- Date unknown - Betsy Brandt, actress (Breaking Bad, Life in Pieces), in Bay City, Michigan

=== Gallery of 1973 births ===
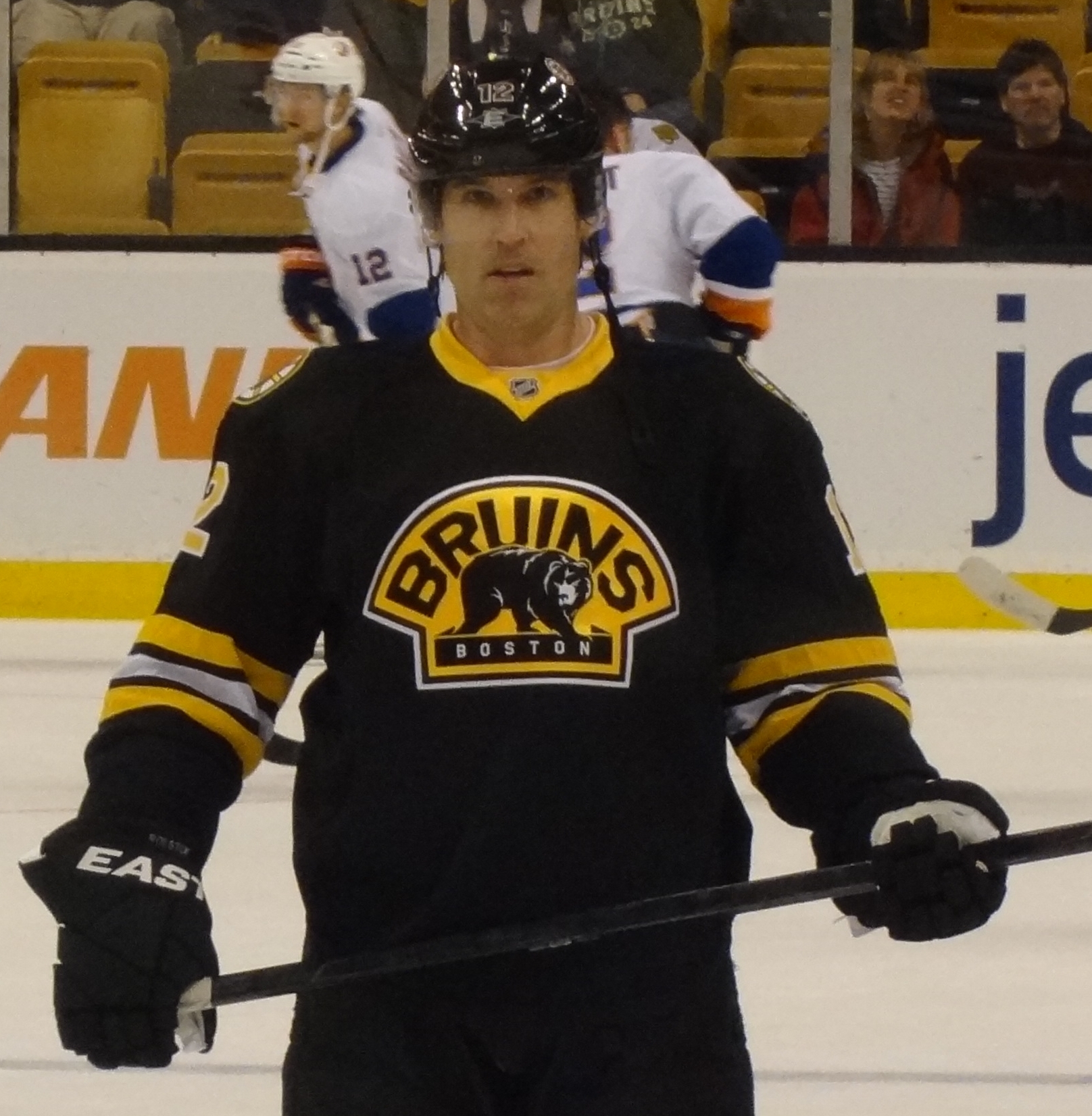
Brian Rolston

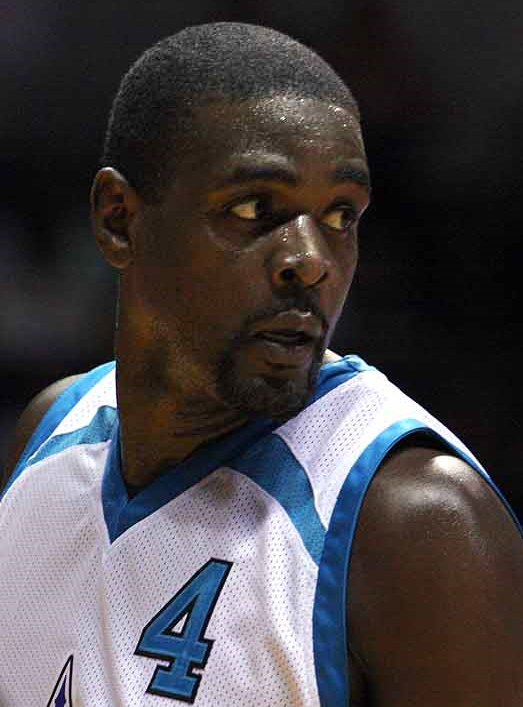
Chris Webber

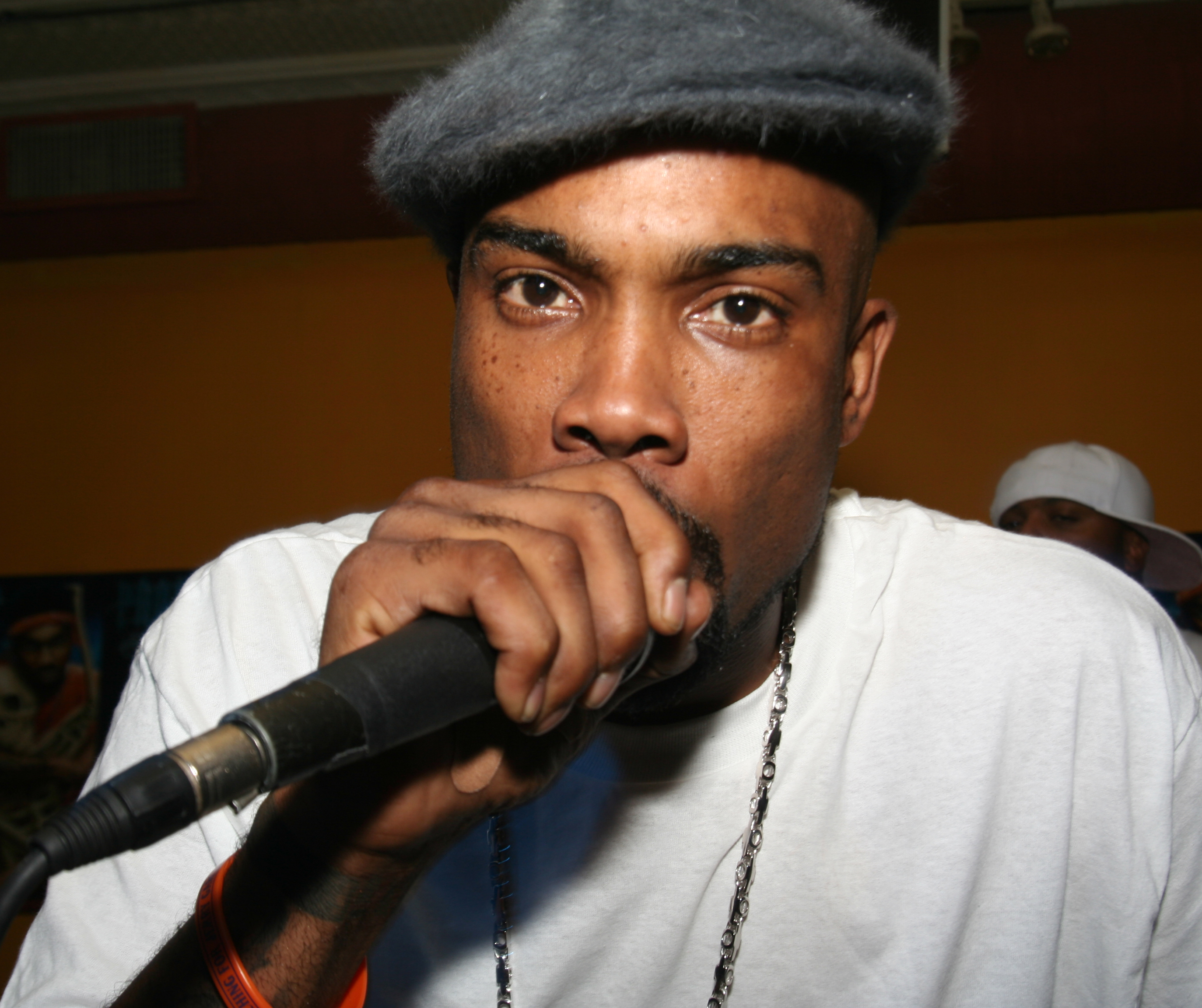
Proof

== Deaths ==
- March 26 - George Sisler, baseball player at the University of Michigan (1913-1915) and Major League Baseball (1915-1930) and Baseball Hall of Fame inductee, at age 80 in Richmond Heights, Missouri
- August 17 - Paul Williams, baritone singer and choreographer and original member of The Temptations, of suicide at age 34 in Detroit
- December 19 - Prentiss M. Brown, U.S. Congressman (1933-1936) and Senator (1936-1943), at age 84 in St. Ignace, Michigan

=== Gallery of 1973 deaths ===
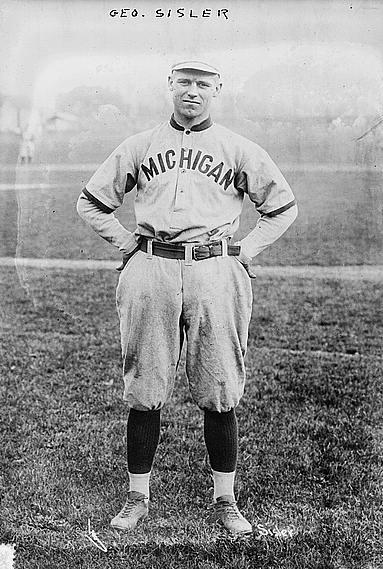
George Sisler

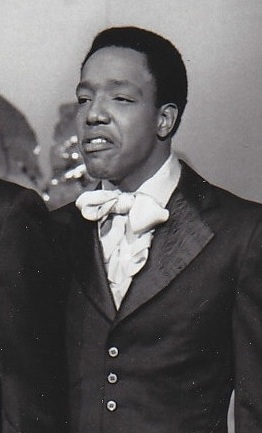
Paul Williams

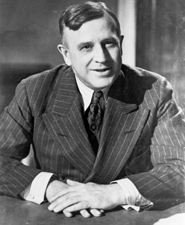
Prentiss M. Brown

== See also ==
- History of Michigan
- History of Detroit
