= 1973 Ohio State vs. Michigan football game =

The Vote for the Roses
Ohio State Buckeyes	Michigan Wolverines
(9–0)	(10–0)
10	10
Head coach: Woody Hayes	Head coach: Bo Schembechler
AP / Coaches; 1 / 1	AP / Coaches; 4 / 4
	1	2	3	4	Total
Ohio State	0	10	0	0	10
Michigan	0	0	0	10	10
- Date: November 24, 1973
- Season: 1973
- Stadium: Michigan Stadium
- Location: Ann Arbor, Michigan
- Referee: Gene Calhoun

United States TV coverage
- Network: ABC
- Announcers: Chris Schenkel and Duffy Daugherty

The 1973 Ohio State vs. Michigan football game was one of the most controversial games in NCAA history. Both teams were undefeated that season, with Ohio State ranked first and Michigan fourth, and the game was crucial for the Big Ten Conference championship and a potential Rose Bowl appearance. Played in heavy rain, with strong defensive play, Ohio State led 10–0 at halftime. Michigan made a comeback in the second half and managed to tie the game at 10–10, despite missed field goal attempts in the final minutes.

Controversy arose after the game, as Michigan believed they were the better team and deserved to go to the Rose Bowl. However, in a vote carried out by Big Ten athletic directors, Ohio State was chosen. This led to anger and accusations of bias.

== Context ==
In this game, both teams were undefeated, with Ohio State ranked first, and Michigan ranked fourth. A conference championship, Rose Bowl appearance, and anticipated national championship were on the line in this crucial game, part of the highly contested stretch of the rivalry known as The Ten Year War. A then-NCAA record crowd of 105,233 watched the game at Michigan Stadium in Ann Arbor.

== The game ==
=== First half ===
With heavy rain prior to the game, the battle was mostly fought on the ground. Michigan had 90 yards passing and Ohio State attempted only four passing plays in a defensive contest. Ohio State failed to make a single first-down in the first quarter, but took an early 3–0 lead in the second quarter, with a 31-yard field goal by Blair Conway. Gil Chapman, Michigan's punt returner returned OSU's ensuing kick-off all the way to the OSU 27-yard line. A significant clipping penalty was called on Michigan which subsequently gave Michigan bad field position. With the way the game had gone, field position proved to be a huge advantage.

After a series of punts, Ohio State got the ball on their own 45-yard line. Back-to-back Heisman Trophy winner Archie Griffin rushed for 41 yards on 5 carries, to get to 100 yards rushing, and OSU to the five-yard line. Fullback Pete Johnson busted his way through the defense for a touchdown just before the half to extend OSU's lead to 10–0.

=== Second half ===
Michigan made defensive halftime adjustments in an attempt to crawl back into the game. The Wolverines out-gained the Buckeyes 209–91 in total yardage in the 2nd half. Michigan took the 2nd half kick-off and marched all the way to the OSU 30-yard line. However, quarterback Dennis Franklin's pass was intercepted in the end zone ruining a productive drive. Midway through the third quarter, OSU faced a 4th and 2 on the Michigan 34-yard line, and decided to go for it. Their failed fourth down conversion gave Michigan new life, and much momentum. It is still looked on today as a controversial coaching call.

Michigan engineered an 11 play drive, using the rushing ability of fullback Ed Shuttlesworth. The Wolverines kicked a field goal to get on the board, and make the score 10–3. Midway through the fourth quarter, Michigan's defense held, and the offense was able to start the tying drive with great field position. Dennis Franklin threw a 35-yard post-out pattern to tight end Paul Seal to get inside the red zone. Three consecutive Michigan offensive plays failed to get them a first down, and they were now faced with a fourth and inches on the ten-yard line.

Ohio State loaded the box with nine defensive players, and focused on stopping Shuttlesworth, who had burned them the entire game. Franklin faked the inside hand-off to Shuttlesworth, and then slipped through the tackles running ten yards for a touchdown, to tie the score at 10–10. Michigan got the ball back with over six minutes to go for the game-winning drive, but had to start at their own ten-yard line. After a couple of completions to Clint Haslerig and some nice runs by Chapman and Shuttlesworth, Michigan made it into OSU territory.

Franklin then threw a seven-yard pass play to Shuttlesworth and was injured, breaking his collar bone with 2:23 left in the game. Three plays later, Michigan kicker Mike Lantry attempted a 58-yard field goal, but the ball missed the left goal-post by a few inches. Ohio State took over, but the backup quarterback, Greg Hare, threw an interception that was returned to the OSU 33 with 52 seconds left. Michigan moved the ball to the OSU 28 before settling for a field goal on 3rd and 5 with 28 seconds to go. For the second consecutive try, the field goal was missed and the game ended in a 10–10 tie.

== Aftermath ==
=== Question of which team would compete in the Rose Bowl ===
Michigan's coaches and players felt that although the game was a tie, that they were the better team and deserved to go to the Rose Bowl. Ohio State coach Woody Hayes said, “We had to win this one to go and we didn't. If they vote Michigan, Michigan deserves to go.”. There was much to debate on who would play in the Rose Bowl as the best representative of the Big Ten Conference.

Ohio State had gone to the Rose Bowl the year before. The Big Ten, alongside the Pacific-8, at the time had a longstanding policy stating that only the conference champion would reach postseason, and that game was the Rose Bowl, and neither conference allowed other teams to appear in postseason games. The Big Ten also had a rule prohibiting teams from appearing in consecutive Rose Bowls until 1971, and had it still been in effect, Michigan would have gone to the Rose Bowl automatically, even if it had lost the game to Ohio State. With the latter rule abolished, the decision as to who would represent the conference would be left up to a telephone vote by the Big Ten's athletic directors.

According to Michigan coach Bo Schembechler's 1989 autobiography, the Big Ten was nervous because the conference had lost the previous four Rose Bowls, and Franklin's injury may have been a deciding factor.

On the day after the game, following a conference call, it was announced that Ohio State would play in the Rose Bowl instead of Michigan. Schembechler was furious at the call, referring to it as "an embarrassment to the Big Ten Conference" and claiming "petty jealousies" were involved. Schembechler went on to demand changes to the Big Ten's policies regarding post-season play. Schembechler was particularly bitter because his 1973 team did not lose a game and was not rewarded with a bowl assignment, and remained angry at the vote until his death in 2006. Schembechler also claimed the Franklin injury was just an excuse, since Michigan's strength was a running game and not a passing attack.

=== Controversies surrounding the vote determining the Rose Bowl participant ===
It was rumored that Michigan State University voted for Ohio State in retaliation for Michigan's "no" vote in 1949 against admitting Michigan State to the Big Ten. There was also a rumor that Michigan State had voted for itself for the same reason. Neither of these charges were ever substantiated. For months afterward, Ohio newspapers would be flooded with letters from angry Wolverine fans, and threats of lawsuits.

Schembechler said he had spoken with Illinois coach Bob Blackman, who said his athletic director, Cecil Coleman, would vote in favor of Michigan. Yet following the vote, it was revealed that Coleman had voted for the Buckeyes. Even if the vote were tied at five-all, Michigan would have been awarded the berth since Ohio State had gone the year before. According to Tiebreaker, a 2013 Big Ten Network documentary dedicated to the 1973 contest, the Buckeyes were supported by Illinois, Northwestern, Purdue, Wisconsin, and possibly Michigan State; the Wolverines were supported by Indiana, Iowa, and Minnesota. Footage from the documentary had audio and printed admissions from Coleman, Iowa's Bump Elliott (Schembechler's predecessor at Michigan), Minnesota's Paul Giel, and Michigan State's J. Burt Smith, who told a crowd at an MSU football banquet on November 28, 1973 that he had voted for Ohio State because he felt they "best met the definition of the most representative team."

It is unknown whether then-Big Ten commissioner Wayne Duke had influenced the vote in Ohio State's favor or not, although a 1973 investigation by the Big Ten Conference Faculty Representatives determined he did not. Until his death in 2017, Wayne Duke continued to vehemently deny that he influenced the vote in any way, saying the athletic directors followed the procedure in place and that he was merely the messenger. Ohio State ended up winning the 1974 Rose Bowl over Southern California by a score of 42-21, the Big Ten's lone Rose Bowl victory from 1970 through 1980, and the Buckeyes' last until 1997.

The next season, Ohio State defeated Michigan 12–10 at Columbus, necessitating a vote to determine the Rose Bowl participant. This time, there was no controversy when the Buckeyes prevailed. Ohio State lost the Rose Bowl 18-17 to Southern California.

Michigan went 30–2–1 over the 1972, '73 and '74 seasons, but had zero bowl appearances to show for it. All three non-wins were against Ohio State.

Among the changes that were made in the Big Ten Conference was, by 1975, to open postseason bids to four teams (since expanded to any team with six wins). This would allow conference teams other than the champion to accept invitations to other bowls. Michigan would be the first team to receive such an invite, to the Orange Bowl following the 1975 season, where it lost 14–6 to national champion Oklahoma. Another change, which also took effect in 1975, was the dropping of the athletic directors' vote in the event of a tie for the championship. The new rule stated that in the event of a tie for the conference title, the team which had gone the longest without appearing in the Rose Bowl would go to Pasadena. Schembechler had pushed for that reform, claiming that the athletic directors were not qualified to decide which team would better represent the conference in the Rose Bowl. That rule was changed following the institution of the conference championship game in 2011. The tie-breaker for that game is the head-to-head result.

The tie ended up biting Ohio State as well, denying the Buckeyes the national championship. Alabama vaulted the Buckeyes into the top spot in both polls, and the Crimson Tide finished the regular season 11–0 to earn the number one ranking in the UPI coaches poll, which did not conduct a post-bowl poll at that time. Notre Dame ended up as AP national champions by defeating Alabama 24–23 in the Sugar Bowl, leaving the Buckeyes second in both wire-service surveys.
