= Clint Haslerig =

American football player (born 1952)

No. 48, 39
- Position: Wide receiver

Personal information
- Born: April 9, 1952 (age 74); Cincinnati, Ohio, U.S.
- Listed height: 6 ft 0 in (1.83 m)
- Listed weight: 233 lb (106 kg)

Career information
- High school: St. Xavier (Cincinnati)
- College: Michigan
- NFL draft: 1974: 4th round, 83rd overall pick

Career history
- Chicago Bears (1974); Buffalo Bills (1974–1975); Minnesota Vikings (1975); New York Jets (1976)

Awards and highlights
- First-team All-Big Ten (1973)
- Stats at Pro Football Reference

Clinton Edward Haslerig (Pronounced: HAZEL-rig) (born April 9, 1952) is an American former professional football player who was a wide receiver in the National Football League (NFL). He played college football for the Michigan Wolverines from 1971 to 1973 and in the NFL from 1974 to 1976 for the Chicago Bears, Buffalo Bills, Minnesota Vikings, and New York Jets.

== Early life ==
Clint Haslerig was born in Cincinnati, Ohio, and attended St. Xavier High School. He was a star athlete for St. Xavier in football and track and was inducted into the school's Hall of Fame in 1991. In the profile of Haserlig written at the time of his induction into the Hall of Fame, the author noted, "This man was a physically imposing specimen who had tremendous speed and strength." In track, he ran the 880 relay. As a junior, he caught 20 passes as the split end for the only undefeated football team in St. Xavier history. He graduated in 1970.

== College football ==
He played college football as a wingback and flanker for the University of Michigan from 1971 to 1973. He was a starter for the 1972 and 1973 Michigan Wolverines football teams that compiled a record of 10–1–1.

During his football career at Michigan, Haslerig totaled 856 all-purpose yards, including 434 receiving yards, 256 rushing yards, and 167 yards on kickoff returns. His longest gains for Michigan both came against Purdue — a 52-yard reception in 1972 and a 41-yard reception in 1973.

In the fourth quarter of the 1972 Ohio State game, Haslerig caught a three-yard pass from Dennis Franklin for a two-point conversion. With 43 seconds remaining in the same game, Haslerig caught a pass at the Ohio State 11-yard-line to set up a possible winning touchdown, but the Wolverines failed to convert and lost 14–11. In his final game for Michigan, he caught five passes for 64 yards in 10–10 tie against Ohio State in 1973. After his final game, The Michigan Daily asked, "Who can forget wingback Clint Haslerig and those perfect pass patterns he ran? Certainly not the Ohio secondary." He was selected as an All-Big Ten player in 1973.

== Professional football ==
Haslerig later played professional football for three seasons for the Chicago Bears (1974), Buffalo Bills (1974–1975), Minnesota Vikings (1975), and New York Jets (1976). He appeared in 26 NFL games, mostly on special teams. He also had two pass receptions for 28 yards, both during his tenure with the Vikings in 1975.

== Later life ==
As of 1991, Haslerig was living in California and working as a partner in a consulting firm. He also served as the National Director of Communications and Marketing for the National Alliance of African American Athletes.
