= Dave Brown (cornerback) =

American football player and coach (1953–2006)

- Brown at Michigan, c. 1974

No. 6, 36, 22, 32
- Position: Cornerback

Personal information
- Born: January 16, 1953; Akron, Ohio, U.S.
- Died: January 10, 2006 (aged 52); Lubbock, Texas, U.S.
- Listed height: 6 ft 1 in (1.85 m)
- Listed weight: 190 lb (86 kg)

Career information
- High school: Garfield (Akron)
- College: Michigan
- NFL draft: 1975: 1st round, 26th overall pick

Career history
- Pittsburgh Steelers (1975); Seattle Seahawks (1976–1986); Green Bay Packers (1987–1990)

Awards and highlights
- Super Bowl champion (X); 2× Second-team All-Pro (1984, 1985); Pro Bowl (1984); Seattle Seahawks 35th Anniversary team; Seattle Seahawks Top 50 players; Seattle Seahawks Ring of Honor; Unanimous All-American (1974); Consensus All-American (1973); 3× First-team All-Big Ten (1972, 1973, 1974)

Career NFL statistics
- Interceptions: 62
- Interception yards: 698
- Touchdowns: 5
- Stats at Pro Football Reference
- College Football Hall of Fame

David Steven Brown (January 16, 1953 – January 10, 2006) was an American professional football player who was a cornerback for 15 seasons in the National Football League (NFL) for the Pittsburgh Steelers (1975), Seattle Seahawks (1976–1986), and Green Bay Packers (1987–1989). He was selected as a second-team All-NFL player in 1984 and a second-team All-AFC player in 1985. His 62 career interceptions ranks tied for tenth in NFL history, with only five players having more interceptions in a career since his career ended in 1989. His 50 interceptions with the Seahawks remains a club record.

Brown also played college football as a safety and punt returner for the Michigan Wolverines from 1972 to 1974. While playing for Michigan, he compiled 526 punt return yards (11.7 yards per return), three punt returns for touchdowns, 174 tackles, nine interceptions, 202 interception return yards, and 15 pass breakups. He was selected as a consensus first-team defensive back on the 1973 College Football All-America Team and a unanimous first-team pick in 1974. He was posthumously inducted into the College Football Hall of Fame in 2007.

In his later years, Brown pursued a career in coaching. He was the defensive backs coach for the Seattle Seahawks from 1992 to 1998 and for the Texas Tech Red Raiders football team from 2001 until his death in January 2006.

== Early life ==
Brown was born in Akron, Ohio, in 1953. His father, Asa Brown, was a skilled rubber worker at a Goodyear tire plant in Akron. Brown played football at Garfield High School in Akron, and graduated in 1971; he began as a quarterback, then played wide receiver and defensive back.

== University of Michigan ==
Brown enrolled at the University of Michigan in 1971 and played college football as a safety and punt returner for head coach Bo Schembechler's Wolverines from 1972 to 1974. Recruited to Michigan as a wide receiver, Brown played on both offense and defense on the freshman team in 1971.

As a sophomore in 1972, Brown started all eleven games at safety. Michigan compiled a 10–1 record and allowed opponents to score only 57 points (5.2 points per game). Brown had three interceptions in 1972, including two interceptions in one game against Minnesota for 82 return yards. He also contributed 11 punt returns for 189 yards (including an 83-yard return for touchdown against Navy), 73 tackles, eight pass breakups and two fumble recoveries, and was first-team All Big Ten. Until the 1975 season, the Big Ten allowed just one bowl team, the representative in the Rose Bowl. Michigan was ranked sixth in both final polls.

As a junior in 1973, Brown again started all eleven games at safety; Michigan compiled an undefeated 10–0–1 record and allowed opponents to score only 68 points (6.2 points per games). Brown also returned 14 punts for 125 yards (8.9 yards per return), including a 53-yard return for touchdown against Michigan State. He also contributed 55 tackles and two interceptions, and was a consensus All-American. Michigan was again ranked sixth in both final polls.

As a senior in 1974, Brown again started all eleven games at safety. Michigan compiled a 10–1 record and was ranked third in the final AP Poll, and allowed opponents to score only 75 points (6.8 points per game). Brown also returned 20 punts for 212 yards (10.6 yards per return), including an 88-yard return for a touchdown against Colorado. He also contributed 46 tackles, four pass breakups and four interceptions, and was a unanimous All-American.

In three years at Michigan, Brown compiled 526 punt return yards (11.7 yards per return), three punt returns for touchdowns, 174 tackles, nine interceptions, 202 interception return yards, and 15 pass breakups. During those three years, Michigan compiled a 30–2–1 (.924) record, tied for the Big Ten championship each year, led the country in scoring defense twice (and finished second the other year), tallied 11 shutouts and gave up more than 10 points only five times. Brown was posthumously inducted into the College Football Hall of Fame in 2007.

== NFL career ==
=== Pittsburgh Steelers ===
Brown was selected in the first round of the 1975 NFL draft by the defending Super Bowl champion Pittsburgh Steelers with the 26th overall pick. Head coach Chuck Noll was surprised to see Brown still available in the first round when it came time for their selection, as he described him as a "hitter; a quality player and person; a leader on the field." As a rookie in 1975, he appeared in 13 games, none as a starter, for the Super Bowl X champions. Brown returned 22 punts for 217 yards, an average of 9.9 yards per return.

=== Seattle Seahawks ===
In the spring of 1976, Brown was chosen by the Seattle Seahawks in the expansion draft. Brown recorded his first interception on October 10 against the Green Bay Packers off Lynn Dickey. His first points as a player came on November 7 when he recorded a tackle in the endzone for a safety against the Atlanta Falcons. In his first two seasons, he recorded four interceptions each. On December 11, 1977, he recorded a touchdown on an interception return for his first ever touchdown as a player; the points were the last the Seahawks scored in a 34–31 victory over the Kansas City Chiefs. He remained with the club for its first eleven seasons, and appeared in 159 games, all as the starting right cornerback.

On November 4, 1984, the Seahawks established an NFL record with four interception returns in one game. Playing the Kansas City Chiefs, Brown intercepted a pass at the 10-yard line and returned it 90 yards for the first pick-six of the game. In the third quarter, he then returned a pass 56 yards for a touchdown to mark his first and only two-touchdown game of his career; Keith Simpson and Kenny Easley returned interceptions of their own for touchdowns in a 45–0 victory. After the 1984 season, Brown was selected to play in the Pro Bowl and was also selected by the Associated Press as a second-team All-NFL player, the first and only time he was honored. He had recorded eight total interceptions that year. Brown continued to be productive in his final two seasons with the Seahawks, recording six interceptions in 1985 and five in 1986.

In his eleven years with the Seahawks, Brown established, and continues to hold, franchise records for interceptions (50), interception return yards (643), and interceptions returned for touchdowns (5). In 1992, Brown became the third player inducted into the Seahawks' "Ring of Honor".

=== Green Bay Packers ===
In August 1987, the Seahawks traded Brown to the Green Bay Packers in exchange for a future draft choice. Brown played three years with the Packers from 1987 to 1989, appearing in 44 games as the starting right cornerback. Brown continued to be productive in his final two seasons with the Seahawks, recording six interceptions in 1985 and five in 1986. In July 1990, the Packers placed Brown on the physically unable-to-perform list due to tendinitis in his Achilles tendon. He was released by the team on April 27, 1991.

=== Career statistics ===
In fifteen years in the NFL, Brown appeared in 216 games, 203 of them as a starter. When Brown retired, he was only the 6th player with 60 interceptions in NFL history. No player recorded more interceptions than Brown did during his football career. He registered 62 career interceptions, which ranks tied for tenth in NFL history. He also registered 698 interception return yards and five interceptions returned for touchdowns.

== Later life ==
After retiring as a player, Brown went into coaching: he was the Seahawks' defensive backs coach from 1992 to 1998, under head coaches Tom Flores and Dennis Erickson. In 2001, he was hired as the defensive backs coach at Texas Tech under head coach Mike Leach. Brown held that position in Lubbock until his death in 2006. During his tenure, Texas Tech defeated Clemson 55–15 in the Tangerine Bowl, beat Navy 38–14 in the Houston Bowl, beat California 45–31 in the Holiday Bowl, and lost to Alabama 13–10 in the Cotton Bowl.

Brown was married and had two sons, Aaron and Sterling, with his wife, Rhonda. On January 10, 2006, Brown died in Lubbock after suffering an apparent heart attack while playing basketball with his son, just six days shy of his 53rd birthday.
