= Jim Coode =

American gridiron football player (1951–1987)

No. 60
- Position: Offensive tackle

Personal information
- Born: October 22, 1951; Mayfield Heights, Ohio, U.S.
- Died: June 17, 1987 (aged 35); Ottawa, Ontario, Canada
- Listed height: 6 ft 4 in (1.93 m)
- Listed weight: 260 lb (118 kg)

Career information
- College: Michigan
- NFL draft: 1974: 7th round, 173rd overall pick

Career history
- 1974–1980: Ottawa Rough Riders

Awards and highlights
- Grey Cup champion (1976); CFL's Most Outstanding Offensive Lineman Award (1978); Leo Dandurand Trophy (1978); Tom Pate Memorial Award (1980); CFL All-Star (1978); 2× CFL East All-Star (1976, 1978); Ottawa Rough Riders #60 retired; 3× Second-team All-Big Ten (1971, 1972, 1973)

James Edward Coode (October 22, 1951 – June 17, 1987) was an American football player. He played college football for the University of Michigan from 1970 to 1973 and professional football for the Detroit Wheels (two games in 1974) and the Ottawa Rough Riders (1974–1980). He was diagnosed with amyotrophic lateral sclerosis (ALS) in 1979 and died in 1987.

== University of Michigan ==
A native of Mayfield Heights, Ohio, Coode enrolled at the University of Michigan in 1969 and played college football as an offensive tackle for Bo Schembechler's Michigan Wolverines football teams from 1970 to 1973. As a junior, he started every game at left tackle for the 1972 Michigan Wolverines football team that compiled a 10–1 record and was ranked No. 6 in the final AP Poll. As a senior, he started nine games at right tackle for the undefeated 1973 Michigan Wolverines football team that compiled a 10–0–1 record and was ranked No. 6 in the final AP Poll.

== Professional football ==
Coode began his professional football career in 1974 with the Detroit Wheels of the World Football League (WFL). He left the Wheels after playing two games when the team was unable to pay its players.

After leaving the WFL, Coode joined the Ottawa Rough Riders of the Canadian Football League (CFL) at the end of September 1974. He played seven seasons in the CFL as an offensive lineman for the Rough Riders and was a part of the Rough Riders' Grey Cup victory in 1976. He won the CFL's Most Outstanding Offensive Lineman Award in 1978 and the Tom Pate Memorial Award for community service in 1980. His jersey (#60) has been retired by the Rough Riders, and re-retired by the REDBLACKS. Coode was diagnosed with ALS in 1979 and appeared in four games for the Rough Riders in 1980 after the diagnosis.

== Family and later years ==
Coode was married to Lisa Coode, and they had a son, Jamie. Coode continued to live in Ottawa after retiring from football. A tribute dinner for Coode in May 1983 drew 1,200 persons. Bo Schembechler spoke at the tribute. By December 1986, Coode's weight had dropped from 275 pounds to 130 pounds. Coode died at a hospital on June 17, 1987.
