= Mike Hoban =

American football player (1952–2023)

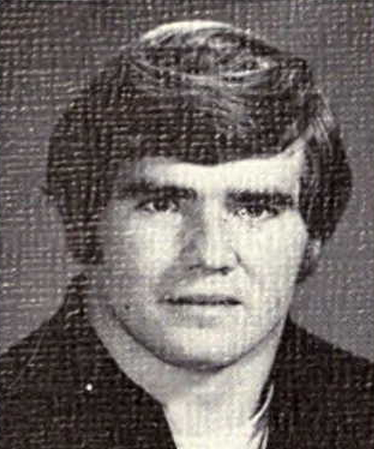
- Hoban from 1974 Michiganensian

No. 69
- Position: Guard

Personal information
- Born: January 9, 1952; Chicago, Illinois, U.S.
- Died: May 30, 2023 (aged 71)
- Listed height: 6 ft 2 in (1.88 m)
- Listed weight: 235 lb (107 kg)

Career information
- High school: Gordon Tech
- College: Michigan
- NFL draft: 1974: undrafted

Career history
- Chicago Bears (1974)

Awards and highlights
- First-team All-Big Ten (1973)

Career NFL statistics
- Games played: 1
- Games started: 0
- Stats at Pro Football Reference

Michael Angelus Hoban (January 9, 1952 – May 30, 2023) was an American professional football player. A native of Chicago, Illinois, Hoban played high school football for Gordon Tech High School. He played college football as an offensive guard for the University of Michigan from 1971 to 1973. As a junior, he started all 11 games at offensive left guard for the 1972 Michigan Wolverines football team that finished with a 10–1 record, ranked No. 6 in the final AP Poll. As a senior, he helped lead the 1973 Michigan Wolverines football team to an undefeated 10-0-1 record and was selected as an All-Big Ten Conference player. After his senior year, Hoban was selected to play for the northern all-star team in the December 1973 Blue–Gray Football Classic. Hoban played as a guard for the Chicago Bears during the 1974 NFL season. Hoban only played for one game during his time with the Bears, as he had a concussion. Hoban and his family appeared in multiple episodes of Family Feud, before and after the Dallas Cowboys special, even including a football stadium background for his time with the Bears, with Richard Dawson as host. In 2013, Hoban was part of the NFL concussion lawsuit.
