= Dave Elliott (gridiron football) =

American football player and coach (born 1952)

Biographical details
- Born: July 4, 1952

Playing career
- 1971–1974: Michigan
- 1975: Montreal Alouettes
- Position: Defensive back

Coaching career (HC unless noted)
- 1975: Miami (FL) (GA)
- 1976: Michigan (part-time assistant)
- 1977–1978: Toledo (DB)
- 1979–1986: Washington State (ILB)
- 1987–1994: Iowa State (WR)
- 1995: Winona State (OC)
- 1996–2000: Morningside
- 2001–2003: Central Connecticut (DC)
- 2004–2009: Youngstown State (WR)
- 2013: Ashland (WR)
- 2014: Ashland (CB)

Head coaching record
- Overall: 7–48

David L. Elliott (born July 4, 1952) is an American football coach and former player. He served as the head football coach at Morningside College in Sioux City, Iowa from 1996 until 2000, compiling a record of 7–48. Elliott played college football at the University of Michigan. He was signed by the Montreal Alouettes of the Canadian Football League (CFL) in 1975. Elliott is the son of Pete Elliott (1926–2013).

== Head coaching record ==
Year	Team	Overall	Conference	Standing	Bowl/playoffs
Morningside Chiefs / Mustangs (North Central Conference) (1996–2000)
1996	Morningside	1–10	0–9	10th	
1997	Morningside	0–11	0–9	10th	
1998	Morningside	2–9	1–8	T–9th	
1999	Morningside	3–8	2–7	T–8th	
2000	Morningside	1–10	0–9	10th	
Morningside:		7–48	3–42		
Total:		7–48			
