= 1973 All-Big Ten Conference football team =

American college football all-star team

The 1973 All-Big Ten Conference football team consists of American football players chosen by various organizations for All-Big Ten Conference teams for the 1973 Big Ten Conference football season.

== Offensive selections ==
=== Quarterbacks ===
- Dennis Franklin, Michigan (AP-1; UPI-1)
- Mitch Anderson, Northwestern (AP-2; UPI-2)

=== Running backs ===
- Archie Griffin, Ohio State (AP-1; UPI-1)
- Ed Shuttlesworth, Michigan (AP-1; UPI-1)
- Billy Marek, Wisconsin (AP-1; UPI-2)
- Gil Chapman, Michigan (UPI-2)
- Chuck Heater, Michigan (AP-2)
- Rick Upchurch, Minnesota (AP-2)
- Stan Key, Northwestern (AP-2)

=== Ends/receivers ===
- Steve Craig, Northwestern (AP-1 [end]; UPI-1 [tight end])
- Garvin Roberson, Illinois (UPI-1 [split end])
- Clint Haslerig, Michigan (UPI-1 [flanker])
- Brian Rollins, Iowa (AP-1 [end])
- Paul Seal, Michigan (AP-2 [end]; UPI-2 [tight end])
- Trent Smock, Indiana (AP-2 [end])
- Jeff Mack, Wisconsin (UPI-2 [split end])
- Brian Baschnagel, Ohio State (UPI-2 [flanker])

=== Tackles ===
- John Hicks, Ohio State (AP-1; UPI-1)
- Kurt Schumacher, Ohio State (UPI-1)
- Keith Fahnhorst, Minnesota (AP-1)
- Jim Coode, Michigan (AP-2; UPI-2)
- Dennis Lick, Wisconsin (AP-2; UPI-2)

=== Guards ===
- Mike Hoban, Michigan (AP-1; UPI-1)
- Jim Kregel, Ohio State (AP-1; UPI-1)
- Gary Hainrihar, Michigan (UPI-2)
- Ralph Perretta, Purdue (UPI-2)
- Darrell Bunge, Minnesota (AP-2)
- Revie Sorey, Illinois (AP-2)

=== Centers ===
- Mike Webster, Wisconsin (AP-1; UPI-1)
- Steven Myers, Ohio State (AP-2; UPI-2)

== Defensive selections ==
=== Defensive linemen ===
- Van DeCree, Ohio State (AP-1 [front 5]; UPI-1 [def. end])
- Steve Neils, Minnesota (AP-1 [front 5]; UPI-1 [def. end])
- Pete Cusick, Ohio State (AP-1 [front 5]; UPI-1 [def. tackle])
- Dave Gallagher, Michigan (AP-1 [front 5]; UPI-1 [def. tackle])
- Vic Koegel, Ohio State (UPI-1 [guard])
- Octavus Morgan, Illinois (AP-1 [front 5])
- John Shinsky, Michigan State (AP-2 [front 5]; UPI-2 [def. tackle])
- Carl Barzilauskas, Indiana (AP-2 [front 5])
- Jim Schymanski, Wisconsin (AP-2 [front 5])
- Steve Strinko, Michigan (AP-2 [front 5])
- Walt Williamson, Michigan (AP-2 [front 5])
- Don Coleman, Michigan (UPI-2 [def. end])
- Jim Cope, Ohio State (UPI-2 [def. end])
- Donald R. Warner, Michigan (UPI-2 [guard])

=== Linebackers ===
- Randy Gradishar, Ohio State (AP-1; UPI-1)
- Rick Middleton, Ohio State (AP-1; UPI-1)
- Mike Varty, Northwestern (AP-1; UPI-2)
- Mark Gefert, Purdue (AP-2)
- Tom Hicks, Illinois (AP-2)
- Ray Nester, Michigan State (AP-2)
- Terence McClowry, Michigan State (UPI-2)

=== Defensive backs ===
- Dave Brown, Michigan (AP-1; UPI-1)
- Neal Colzie, Ohio State (AP-1; UPI-1)
- Mike Gow, Illinois (AP-1; UPI-1)
- Bill Simpson, Michigan State (AP-2; UPI-1)
- Earl Douthitt, Iowa (AP-2; UPI-2)
- Tim Racke, Purdue (AP-2)
- Steve Luke, Ohio State (UPI-2)
- Mark Niesen, Michigan State (UPI-2)
- Quinn Buckner, Indiana (UPI-2)

== Key ==
AP = Associated Press

UPI = United Press International, selected by the conference coaches

Bold = Consensus first-team selection of both AP and UPI

== See also ==
- 1973 College Football All-America Team
