= Dave Gallagher (American football) =

American football player (1952–2025)

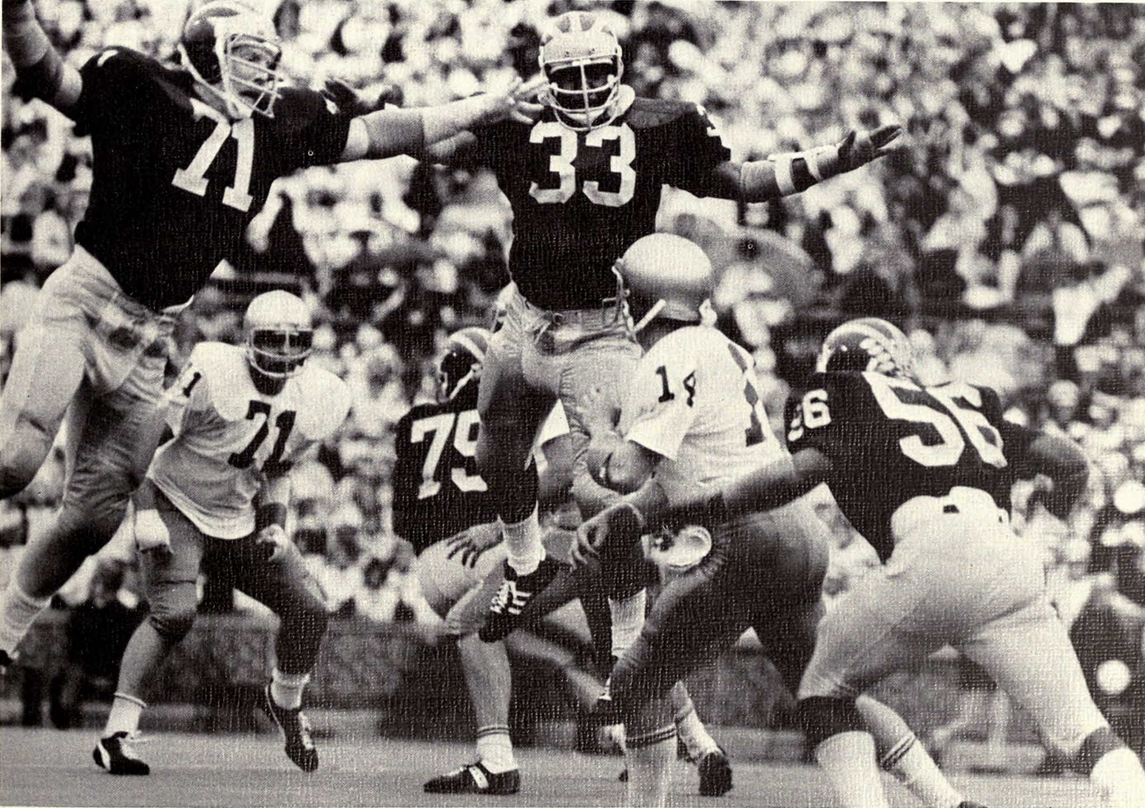
- Gallagher (No. 71) and Carl Russ loom over an opposing QB, 1973

No. 76, 71
- Position: Defensive tackle

Personal information
- Born: January 2, 1952; Piqua, Ohio, U.S.
- Died: January 2, 2025 (aged 73); Columbus, Indiana, U.S.
- Listed height: 6 ft 4 in (1.93 m)
- Listed weight: 256 lb (116 kg)

Career information
- High school: Piqua (OH)
- College: Michigan
- NFL draft: 1974: 1st round, 20th overall pick

Career history
- Chicago Bears (1974); New York Giants (1975–1976); Detroit Lions (1978–1979)

Awards and highlights
- Consensus All-American (1973); First-team All-Big Ten (1973)

Career NFL statistics
- Sacks: 4.5
- Fumble recoveries: 6
- Interceptions: 1
- Stats at Pro Football Reference

David Dillon Gallagher (January 2, 1952 – January 20, 2025) was an American professional football player who was a defensive tackle in the National Football League (NFL). He played college football for the Michigan Wolverines, earning consensus All-American honors in 1973. He played in the NFL from 1974 to 1979.

== College career ==
The University of Michigan's Bentley Historical Library describes Gallagher's contributions as: "One of the finest defensive tackles ever to play at Michigan." In 1971, he was named to the sophomore All-American team. As a senior in 1973, he was a co-captain of the Michigan football team. He made 83 tackles in 1973 and 1975 in his three years playing for Bo Schembechler's Wolverines. He was a consensus first-team All-American as a senior, was also selected twice to the All-Big Ten Academic squad, and was also a recipient of a National Football Foundation and College Football Hall of Fame postgraduate scholarship.

== Professional career ==
Gallagher was selected 20th overall in the first round of the 1974 NFL draft. He had planned to attend medical school, but decided to forgo that to play professional football.

He played five years in the NFL for the Chicago Bears (1974), the New York Giants (1975–1976). He retired from professional football in 1976 and entered medical school. However, in 1978, he returned to professional football. He played for the Detroit Lions in 1978 and 1979.

== Honors ==
In 2005, Gallagher was selected as one of the 100 greatest Michigan football players of all time by the "Motown Sports Revival," ranking 65th on the all-time team.

== See also ==
Michigan Wolverines Football All-Americans
