= Jim Lyall (American football) =

American football player and coach (born 1952)

Biographical details
- Born: June 25, 1952 (age 74)

Playing career
- 1970–1973: Michigan
- Position: Defensive tackle

Coaching career (HC unless noted)
- 1974–1989: Adrian (assistant)
- 1990–2009: Adrian
- 2011–2015: Siena Heights

Head coaching record
- Overall: 116–113–1 (varsity); 8–1 (club)

Accomplishments and honors

Championships
- 1 MIAA (1997); 1 MSFA Mideast League (2014)

James M. Lyall (born June 25, 1952) is an American former college football player and coach. He was most recently the head football coach at Siena Heights University, a position he held from 2011 until May 2016. Lyall was the head football coach at Adrian College from 1990 to 2009. He played as a defensive tackle for the University of Michigan under head coach Bo Schembechler from 1970 to 1973. As a senior, he was awarded Champion of the Year by the Michigan coaching staff.

== Coaching career ==
=== Adrian ===
Lyall was the head football coach at Adrian College in Adrian, Michigan. He held that position for 20 seasons, from 1990 until 2009. His coaching record at Adrian was 97–92–1.

Lyall was fired in November 2009. The program had improved considerably over the previous eight years, with a vastly improved roster, a 55–25 record, and five runner-up finishes in the Michigan Intercollegiate Athletic Association. Jim Deere, an assistant coach under Lyall, was hired as the new head coach.

=== Siena Heights ===
Lyall became the first head coach for the program at Siena Heights starting in the 2011 season. Lyall was named AFCA Region 5 National Coach of the Year and MSFA Mideast Coach of the Year in 2014. He retired from Siena Heights in May 2016 due to health concerns.

== Head coaching record ==
| Year | Team | Overall | Conference | Standing | Bowl/playoffs |
|---|---|---|---|---|---|
Adrian Bulldogs (Michigan Intercollegiate Athletic Association) (1990–2009)
| 1990 | Adrian | 4–4–1 | 2–2–1 | 4th | |
| 1991 | Adrian | 4–5 | 1–4 | T–5th | |
| 1992 | Adrian | 2–7 | 2–3 | T–3rd | |
| 1993 | Adrian | 2–7 | 1–4 | 5th | |
| 1994 | Adrian | 3–6 | 2–3 | T–3rd | |
| 1995 | Adrian | 6–3 | 3–2 | T–2nd | |
| 1996 | Adrian | 3–6 | 1–4 | 6th | |
| 1997 | Adrian | 8–1 | 5–1 | T–1st | |
| 1998 | Adrian | 5–4 | 3–3 | T–3rd | |
| 1999 | Adrian | 2–7 | 1–5 | 6th | |
| 2000 | Adrian | 2–8 | 1–4 | 5th | |
| 2001 | Adrian | 2–8 | 2–3 | 4th | |
| 2002 | Adrian | 6–4 | 3–3 | T–3rd | |
| 2003 | Adrian | 8–2 | 4–2 | T–2nd | |
| 2004 | Adrian | 6–4 | 3–4 | 5th | |
| 2005 | Adrian | 8–2 | 5–2 | T–2nd | |
| 2006 | Adrian | 5–5 | 4–3 | 4th | |
| 2007 | Adrian | 7–3 | 4–3 | T–4th | |
| 2008 | Adrian | 8–2 | 5–1 | 2nd | |
| 2009 | Adrian | 6–4 | 4–2 | T–2nd | |
| Adrian: | | 97–92–1 | 56–58–1 | | |
Siena Heights Saints (Mid-States Football Association) (2012–2015)
| 2012 | Siena Heights | 4–6 | 2–3 | 4th (MEL) | |
| 2013 | Siena Heights | 5–5 | 2–4 | 6th (MEL) | |
| 2014 | Siena Heights | 6–4 | 5–1 | T–1st (MEL) | |
| 2015 | Siena Heights | 4–6 | 2–4 | T–4th (MEL) | |
| Siena Heights: | | 19–21 | 11–12 | | |
| Total: | | 116–113–1 | | | |
National championship Conference title Conference division title or championship game berth
