= Chuck Heater =

American football player and coach (born 1952)

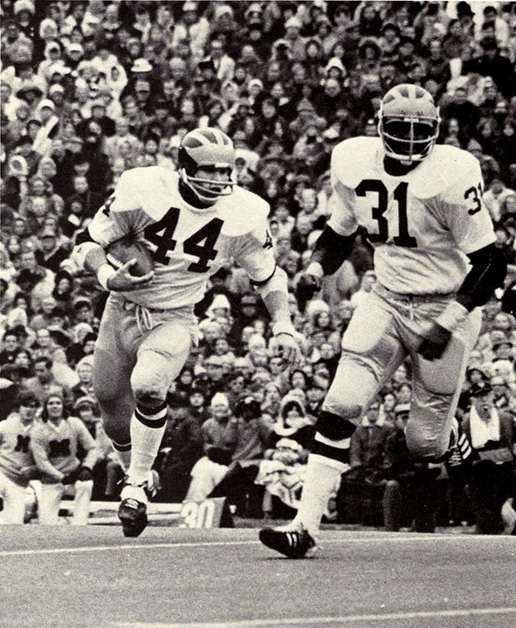
- Heater (No. 44) and Ed Shuttlesworth

Biographical details
- Born: October 10, 1952 (age 74); Weston, West Virginia, U.S.

Playing career
- 1971–1974: Michigan
- 1976: Pontiac Arrows
- Position: Running back

Coaching career (HC unless noted)
- 1976: Northern Arizona (RB)
- 1977–1978: Toledo (RB)
- 1979–1981: Toledo (DB)
- 1982–1984: Wisconsin (DB)
- 1985–1987: Ohio State (DB)
- 1988–1990: Notre Dame (DB)
- 1991–1992: Colorado State (DC)
- 1993: Colorado (RC)
- 1994: Colorado (DB)
- 1995–1997: Colorado (TE)
- 1998: Colorado (TE/RC)
- 1999–2001: Washington (CB/RC)
- 2002–2003: Washington (RB/RC)
- 2004: Utah (CB/RC)
- 2005–2007: Florida (CB/RC)
- 2008–2009: Florida (asst. DC/S)
- 2010: Florida (co-DC/S)
- 2011–2012: Temple (DC/DB)
- 2013–2017: Marshall (DC/S)
- 2018: Maryland (S)
- 2019: Florida (QC)
- 2020–2021: Colorado State (DC)

Accomplishments and honors

Awards
- Second-team All-Big Ten (1973)

Chuck Heater (born October 10, 1952) is an American football coach and former player. He was a running back for the University of Michigan from 1972 to 1974 and finished his playing career as the fifth all-time leading rusher in Michigan Wolverines football history. Heater has been an assistant football coach at ten universities since 1976. He has been affiliated with College Football Hall of Fame coaches Bo Schembechler (as a player), Earle Bruce (as an assistant at Ohio State and Colorado State), and Lou Holtz (as an assistant at Notre Dame). He has been on coaching staffs of national championship teams at Notre Dame (1988) and Florida (2006 and 2008).

== Early years ==
A native of West Virginia, Heater attended Columbian High School in Tiffin, Ohio. He rushed for more than 1,000 yards and scored more than 100 points in both his junior year in 1969 and his senior year in 1970. In his three years as a starter for Columbian, Heater accounted for 3,530 total yards and scored a total of 310 points, including 158 points as a senior. He was also selected as an All-Ohio player in his senior year. In February 1971, Heater announced that he had accepted a scholarship to attend the University of Michigan.

== University of Michigan ==
Heater played at the running back position for Bo Schembechler's Michigan Wolverines football team from 1972 to 1974. He accumulated 1,995 rushing yards, 17 rushing touchdowns and averaged 4.9 yards per carry. In October 1972, Heater established himself as a star in his third game for Michigan, passing for two touchdowns and rushing for 94 yards and a third touchdown in a 35–7 victory over Navy. In its game coverage, the UPI credited Heater, who came into the game as a substitute, for firing the Wolverines' 28-point third quarter:

"THE Wolverines blew scoring opportunities and were sluggish on offense until substitute Chuck Heater, a six-foot, 205-pound tailback from Tiffin, Ohio, entered the game as Harry Banks' replacement in the second quarter. The darting sophomore gained 89 yards, 59 of them in the third quarter when he scored on a 13-yard run off left tackle to give Michigan a 28-0 lead."

Heater had four 100-yard rushing games for the Wolverines, gaining 155 yards against Illinois in 1972, 133 yards against Iowa in 1973, 128 yards against Indiana in 1973, and 101 yards against Wisconsin in 1974. His longest run from scrimmage was for a 71-yard gain against Indiana in 1973.

As a sophomore in 1972, Heater reportedly found himself in Schembechler's doghouse after missing a day of practice after his wedding. The Chicago Tribune reported: "You know why Chuck Heater, the Michigan back, got in Coach Bo Schembechler's doghouse? Chuck skipped a day of practice for a honeymoon. Not sufficient excuse, ruled Bo."

At the time he completed his college career in 1974, Heater ranked fourth all-time among Michigan's career rushing leaders since official records were maintained starting in 1949. The only players ahead of him were Billy Taylor (3,072 yards), Ron Johnson (2,417 yards) and Ed Shuttlesworth (2,333 yards). Heater also received the Fielding Yost Award in 1975 as the most outstanding academic and athletic performance by a senior. The Wolverines compiled a record of 41–3–1 during Heater's four years with the team and won or tied for the Big Ten Conference championship every season.

After completing his senior year at Michigan, Heater was selected to play as a running back for the Blue team in the 1974 Blue–Gray Football Classic.

== Professional football ==
Heater was drafted by the New Orleans Saints in the tenth round (241st overall pick) of the 1975 NFL draft. He signed with the Saints in June 1975, but he was released in early September 1975, shortly before the opening game of the regular season. Heater played for the Pontiac Arrows of the Midwest Football League in 1976.

== Coaching career ==
=== Northern Arizona ===
When Heater was released by the Saints, he returned to Michigan for graduate work in educational psychology. In 1976, he learned from a friend about an opening on the coaching staff at Northern Arizona University. He was hired as the offensive backfield coach working under head coach Joe Salem. Heater took over a backfield that had fumbled 46 times in 1975. Under Heater's tutelage, the Northern Arizona backfield fumbled only 14 times in 1976. Northern Arizona running back Carl Golden also led the Big Sky Conference in rushing in 1976.

Heater later recalled that he had no intention of coaching football when he graduated from Michigan. He said, "I found out it's what I know most about anyway — football. I found out it's really what I wanted to do. Coaching is suited to my abilities."

=== Toledo ===
In December 1976, after completing one season at Northern Arizona, Heater was hired by the University of Toledo near his hometown of Tiffin, Ohio. At Toledo, he joined the staff of head coach Chuck Stobart who had coached Heater at Michigan. Heater spent five years on the Toledo coaching staff, working as the running backs coach from 1977 to 1978 and as the secondary coach from 1979 to 1981.

=== Wisconsin ===
In 1982, Heater was hired by Wisconsin as the defensive backfield coach under head coach Dave McClain. Shortly after being hired at Wisconsin, Heater told a Wisconsin newspaper, "I don't think I'll be a legendary coach, but I want to do my job and do it well. If I do those things, I'll get where I want to go. I'm not going to worry about tomorrow. I'll just do well today and things will take care of themselves." Heater remained at Wisconsin for three years.

=== Ohio State ===
In March 1985, Heater was hired by Ohio State as the secondary coach under head coach Earle Bruce. He spent three years on Bruce's staff at Ohio State and left when Bruce was fired at the end of the 1987 season.

=== Notre Dame ===
In February 1988, Heater was hired as the defensive secondary coach at Notre Dame under head coach Lou Holtz. He was on the Notre Dame coaching staff in 1988 when Notre Dame won its last national championship. He remained on Holtz's staff at Notre Dame for three years through the 1990 season.

=== Colorado State ===
In February 1991, Heater was hired as the defensive coordinator at Colorado State University. He joined the staff of Earle Bruce under whom he had coached at Ohio State four years earlier. At the time of the hiring, Bruce said, "Chuck is an outstanding coach who will fit well in our program." Heater remained with Colorado State for two years but left after the 1992 season when Earl Bruce was fired as the team's head coach.

=== Colorado ===
In 1993, Heater was hired as the recruiting coordinator for the Colorado Buffaloes football team. Colorado head coach Bill McCartney had been an assistant coach at Michigan during Heater's senior year. In February 1994, after the NCAA eliminated the position of recruiting coordinator, McCartney hired Heater as his defensive secondary coach. In March 1995, Colorado's new head coach Rick Neuheisel moved Heater to a new position as the team's tight ends coach. He remained the tight ends coach at Colorado for four years from 1995 to 1998 and also resumed his duties as recruiting coordinator in 1998.

=== Washington ===
In January 1999, Heater followed Rick Neuheisel to the University of Washington, accepting a positions as cornerbacks coach and recruiting coordinator. Heater spent five years on the Washington coaching staff, though he moved to offense in 2002 as the running backs coach.

=== Utah ===
In February 2004, Heater joined new head coach Urban Meyer as the defensive secondary coach at the University of Utah. Heater had worked with fellow Ohio native Meyer on Earl Bruce's staff at both Ohio State and Colorado State.

=== Florida ===
In February 2005, Heater followed Urban Meyer to the University of Florida as cornerbacks coach and recruiting coordinator. In September 2006, Meyer said of Heater: "He's one of the best teachers. I used to just sit in his meetings and watch him coach." In the 2008 Capital One Bowl, Heater coached against the Michigan Wolverines for the 14th time in his career. At the time, Heater told the press, "It's nothing new for me, but it's always a game I look forward to because I have a lot of respect for their program and who they are." After three years as the cornerbacks coach, Heater became the Gators assistant defensive coordinator under Charlie Strong and safeties coach in 2008. In January 2010, Heater was promoted to co-defensive coordinator.

=== Temple ===
In 2011, Heater was hired as the defensive coordinator and defensive back's coach at Temple University under new head coach Steve Addazio.

Heater has coached teams in 23 bowl games, including the 2007 and 2009 BCS National Championship Games.

=== Marshall ===
In January 2013, Heater returned home to West Virginia as the new defensive coordinator under head coach and long time friend Doc Holliday.

=== Maryland ===
In January 2018, Maryland Terrapins head coach D.J. Durkin hired Heater to be the safeties coach for the 2018 season.

=== Return to Florida ===
In March 2019, Heater returned to Florida to serve in an off-field role under head coach Dan Mullen.

=== Return to Colorado State ===
In January 2020, Heater was re-hired as the defensive coordinator at Colorado State, reuniting him with head coach Steve Addazio.

Heater was replaced by Freddie Banks prior to the 2022 season as Addazio was replaced as head coach.

== Personal life ==
Heater and his wife, the former Deborah Dariano, have a daughter, Emily, and two sons, Andy and Adam. While Heater was coaching at Washington, his son Andy played at the tight end position for the Huskies. Adam played tight end and center for the UCLA Bruins.
