= Ed Shuttlesworth =

American gridiron football player (born 1952)

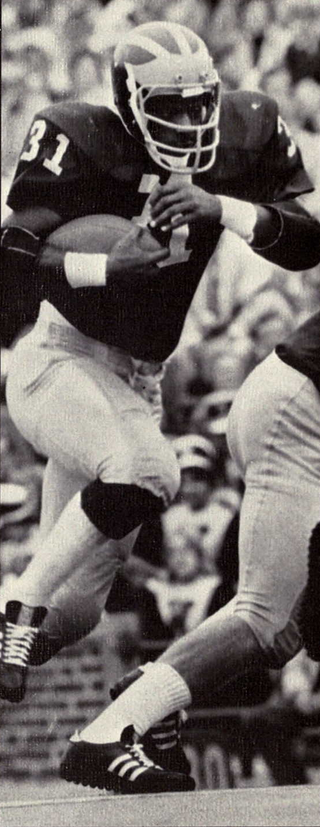
- Shuttlesworth from 1974 Michiganensian

Profile
- Position: Fullback

Personal information
- Born: June 4, 1952 (age 74); Ohio, U.S.
- Listed height: 6 ft 2 in (1.88 m)
- Listed weight: 225 lb (102 kg)

Career information
- High school: Woodward (Cincinnati)
- College: Michigan

Career history
- 1971–1973: Univ. of Michigan
- 1974–1975: Toronto Argonauts

Awards and highlights
- 2× First-team All-Big Ten (1972, 1973); Second-team All-Big Ten (1971)

Ed Shuttlesworth (born June 4, 1952) is an American former football fullback.

He played for the University of Michigan from 1971 to 1973. He was the leading rusher for Michigan's 1972 and 1973 teams that compiled a combined record of 20–1–1. At the time of his graduation, he was Michigan's all-time leader in rushing attempts (532) and ranked third in rushing yards (2,333 yards).

After graduating from Michigan, Shuttlesworth played for the Toronto Argonauts in 1974 and 1975. With 866 rushing yards in his rookie year, he was the third leading rusher in the Canadian Football League (CFL).

== Early life ==
A native of Ohio, Shuttlesworth attended Woodward High School in Cincinnati.

== University of Michigan ==
Shuttlesworth enrolled at the University of Michigan in 1970.

=== 1971 season ===
As a sophomore, Shuttlesworth made his debut with the 1971 Michigan Wolverines football team that finished the regular season with an undefeated 11–0 record. Shuttlesworth began the season as a backup fullback, playing as a substitute for Fritz Seyferth.

In the second game of the season, a 56–0 win over Virginia, Shuttlesworth led the team with 107 rushing yards on 16 carries for an average of 6.7 yards per carry. He also scored his first college touchdown in the Virginia game. After the game, Larry Paladino, for the Associated Press, described Shuttlesworth as "a bruising, 235-pound, second string fullback."

In a game against Minnesota in late October, Shuttlesworth outgained starting fullback Seyferth by 96 yards to 25 yards. Two weeks later, Shuttlesworth got his first start in a 63–7 win over Iowa, Michigan's highest point total since 1947. In the Iowa game, Shuttlesworth rushed for 112 yards (86 yards in the first quarter) and three touchdowns on only 16 carries for an average of 7.0 yards per carry.

One week after the Iowa game, Shuttlesworth was named UPI Midwest Back of the Week after rushing for 125 yards and three touchdowns against Purdue. After the Purdue game, the UPI noted that the Michigan Gridiron Guide described Shuttlesworth as having "tremendous raw potential." The UPI concluded that Coach Schembechler had "turned that raw potential into running might."

Playing against Stanford in the 1972 Rose Bowl, Shuttlesworth made a key play on kick coverage, hitting Stanford's Jim Ferguson at the two-yard line and knocking him back into the end zone for a safety. The safety gave Michigan a 12–10 lead, but Stanford kicked a late field goal to win by a score of 13–12.

Shuttlesworth gained 877 yards and scored six touchdowns on 182 carries in 1971 for an average of 4.8 yards per carry. He was the team's second leading rusher behind Billy Taylor (1,297 yards).

=== 1972 season ===
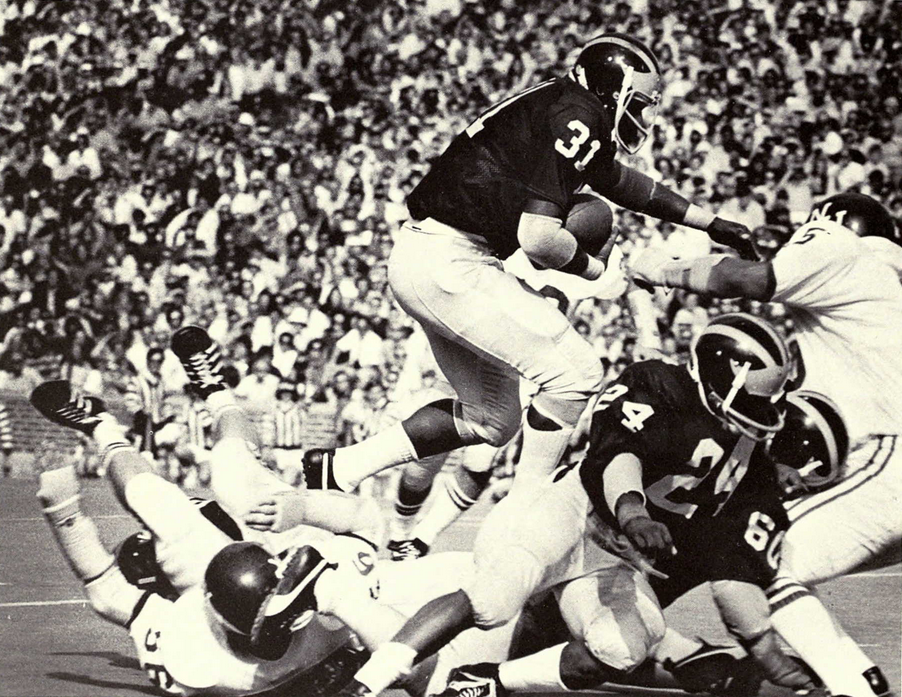
Shuttlesworth hurdling over the Northwestern line, 1972

As a junior, Shuttlesworth again began the season as a backup (to Bob Thornbladh), but won the starting job in the second game of the year. Shuttlesworth was the starting fullback in eight games for the 1972 team that finished with a record of 10–1. As in 1971, Shuttlesworth had three games in which he rushed for more than 100 yards. Early in the season, he reached the 1,000-yard milestone in career rushing, hitting the mark sooner than any player in Wolverine history.

Shuttlesworth had the best game of his career against 18th ranked Tulane on September 30, 1972, rushing for 151 yards and scoring three touchdowns on 20 carries for an average of 7.5 yards per carry. After the Tulane game, the Associated Press called Shuttlesworth "the human bulldozer", and Shuttlesworth told reporters:

I'm working on my open field running. I'm learning to read defenses better. Up to now I've been a power runner, but my breakaway running is coming along. I'm learning to cut and look for the end zone.

Michigan head coach Bo Schembechler added, "We're trying to get Shuttlesworth to lift his legs more in the secondary. He is potentially a breakaway runner and he can go all the way."

Later in the year, Shuttlesworth gained only 86 yards but scored a career-high four touchdowns against Minnesota. He scored all four touchdowns in the first half on runs of less than four yards or less. He was Michigan's leading rusher in 1972 with 716 rushing yards and 11 touchdowns on 157 carries for an average of 4.5 yards per carry.

=== 1973 season ===
As a senior, Shuttlesworth started all 11 games at fullback for the undefeated 1973 Michigan Wolverines football team that finished the season with a 10–0–1 record. For the second straight year, he was Michigan's leading rusher. He accumulated 746 rushing yards and nine touchdowns on 193 carries for an average of 3.9 yards per carry. In his final game for Michigan, Shuttlesworth rushed for 116 yards in a 10–10 tie with Ohio State. After the Ohio State game, Michigan head coach Bo Schembechler told reporters, "We had a great fullback in there today. That man Shuttlesworth really ran. He came to play."

In January 1974, Shuttlesworth played for the East All-Stars in the Hula Bowl. Bo Schembechler coached the East All-Stars and called on Shuttlesworth to carry the ball 22 times. Shuttlesworth, who led the East team to a victory with his 86 rushing yards, told the press after the game, "I don't mind doing all that work. It's my job."

=== Career statistics ===
In three years at Michigan, Shuttlesworth gained 2,333 rushing yards and 26 touchdowns on 532 carries for an average of 4.4 yards per carry. He had seven 100-yard rushing games and seven games in which he scored multiple touchdowns. At the time of his graduation, he ranked first in rushing attempts and third in rushing yards at Michigan. His rushing yardage trailed only Ron Johnson (2,417 yards) and Billy Taylor (3,072 yards).

== Professional football ==
Shuttlesworth was selected by the Baltimore Colts in the second round (37th overall) of the 1974 NFL draft. He opted instead to play for the Toronto Argonauts in the Canadian Football League. He signed a three-year contract with the Argonauts in March 1974. In April 1974, a Maryland sports columnist expressed dismay at the Colts' inability to sign Shuttlesworth:

But the Colts' future was stunted somewhat a few weeks back when Michigan fullback Ed Shuttlesworth, a second round draft pick, wanted no parts of the Colt organization and signed a pact with the CFL Toronto Argonauts. Colts general manager Joe Thomas was stunned at Shuttlesworth's decision, saying, 'His agent never gave me a chance to make a bid for Shuttlesworth,' who could have solved the Hosses' fullback dilemma.

In 1974, he was the third leading rusher in the CFL with 866 rushing yards and five touchdowns on 191 carries for an average of 4.5 yards per carry. In 1975, he gained 101 rushing yards on 21 carries for an average of 4.8 yards per carry.

In 1976, Shuttlesworth played with the Baltimore Colts during the pre-season. He did not play with the Colts during the regular season. In 1977, Shuttlesworth attended training camp with the Philadelphia Eagles and scored on a 30-yard touchdown run in an exhibition game against the Washington Redskins. However, he was waived by the Eagles in early August 1977 and did not make the regular season lineup.

== Later life ==
After retiring from football, Shuttlesworth became a computer software professional working in the Atlanta area.
