= Paul Seal =

American football player (born 1952)

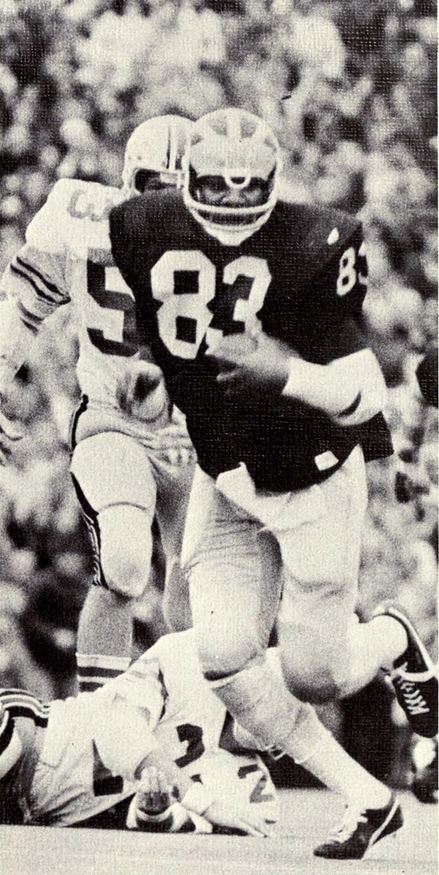
- Seal from 1974 Michiganensian

No. 84, 85
- Position: Tight end

Personal information
- Born: February 27, 1952 (age 74); Detroit, Michigan, U.S.
- Listed height: 6 ft 4 in (1.93 m)
- Listed weight: 222 lb (101 kg)

Career information
- High school: Pershing (Detroit)
- College: Michigan
- NFL draft: 1974: 2nd round, 36th overall pick

Career history
- New Orleans Saints (1974–1976); San Francisco 49ers (1977–1979)

Awards and highlights
- PFWA NFL All-Rookie Team (1974); Second-team All-American (1973); Second-team All-Big Ten (1973)

Career NFL statistics
- Receptions: 106
- Receiving yards: 1,586
- Total TDs: 8
- Stats at Pro Football Reference

Paul Nathan Seal (born February 27, 1952) is an American former professional football player. He played college football as a tight end for the University of Michigan from 1971 to 1973 and professional football as a tight end in the National Football League (NFL) for the New Orleans Saints from 1974 to 1976 and for the San Francisco 49ers from 1977 to 1979. In his six-year NFL career, Seal totaled 106 receptions, 1,586 receiving yards and seven touchdowns.

== Early life ==
Seal was born in Detroit, Michigan, in 1952. He attended Pershing High School in Detroit.

== College career ==
Seal enrolled at the University of Michigan in 1970 and played college football as a tight end for Bo Schembechler's Michigan Wolverines football teams from 1971 to 1973.

As a junior, Seal started all 12 games at tight end for the 1972 Michigan Wolverines football team that compiled a 10–1 record, outscored opponents 264–57, and finished the season ranked #6 in the final AP Poll. Playing for a run-oriented offense, Seal was the leading receiver for the 1972 Wolverines with 18 receptions for 243 yards and three touchdowns.

As a senior, Seal started all 11 games at tight end, was a team co-captain and was voted the Most Valuable Player on the undefeated 1973 Michigan Wolverines football team that compiled a 10–0–1 record, outscored opponents 330–68, and finished the season ranked #6 in the final AP Poll. For the second straight year, Seal was Michigan's leading receiver with 14 catches for 254 yards and three touchdowns. At the end of the 1973 season, Seal was selected by the United Press International (UPI) as the second-team tight end on the 1973 College Football All-America Team.

== Professional career ==
Seal was selected by the New Orleans Saints in the second round (36th overall pick) of the 1974 NFL draft. Seal was also the top draft pick of the Detroit Wheels of the World Football League, but he opted to sign with the Saints in April 1974. He played three seasons with the Saints from 1974 to 1976. As a rookie in 1974, Seal appeared in 14 games and had career highs with 32 receptions, 466 receiving yards, and three receiving touchdowns. In 1975, Seal was the Saints' starting tight end in all 14 games and totaled 28 receptions, 414 receiving yards, and one touchdown.

In early September 1977, the Saints traded Seal to the San Francisco 49ers in exchange for offensive lineman John Watson. Seal played for the 49ers for three seasons from 1977 to 1979, appearing in 43 games, nine as a starter, and totaled 37 receptions for 634 receiving yards and three touchdowns. Seal's longest reception of his NFL career came on a 47-yard touchdown bomb from Jim Plunkett in December 1977 against the Dallas Cowboys.
