= Bob Thornbladh =

American football player and coach (born 1952)

Biographical details
- Born: September 19, 1952 (age 74); Cleveland, Ohio, U.S.

Playing career
- 1971–1973: Michigan
- 1974: Kansas City Chiefs
- Positions: Fullback, Linebacker

Coaching career (HC unless noted)
- 1980–1986: Michigan (assistant)

Robert N. M. "Blade" Thornbladh (born September 19, 1952) is an American former football player, coach and radio color commentator. He played professionally as a linebacker for the Kansas City Chiefs of the National Football League (NFL)

Thornbladh played college football for the Michigan Wolverines team from 1971 to 1973 and was an assistant coach at Michigan from 1980 to 1986. He later served as the color commentator for Michigan football broadcasts on WJR radio.

== Playing career ==
Thornbladh was born in Cleveland, Ohio, in 1952 and graduated from Plymouth High School in Plymouth, Michigan. He enrolled at the University of Michigan in 1970 and played at the fullback position for the Wolverines from 1971 to 1973. He gained 677 rushing yards for the Wolverines on 163 carries for an average of 4.2 yards per carry. He scored 11 rushing touchdowns, and his longest run for Michigan was a 31-yard gain against Wisconsin in 1973. Thornbladh also had seven pass receptions for Michigan, gaining 55 yards for an average of 7.9 yards per reception. He also returned five kickoffs for 52 yards for an average of 10.4 yards per return.

Thornbladh was selected by the Kansas City Chiefs in the 11th round of the 1974 NFL draft (275th overall pick). He made the Chiefs' regular season roster in the 1974 NFL season as a backup to middle linebacker Willie Lanier, but he played only on the special teams in 14 regular season games. In July 1975, the Chiefs traded Thornbladh to the Detroit Lions for an undisclosed future draft choice. The Lions placed Thornbladh on waivers in August 1975.

== Coaching career ==
In 1976, Thornbladh returned to the University of Michigan as a graduate assistant on Bo Schembechler's coaching staff. In 1976, Thornbladh accompanied the team to the Rose Bowl and was the subject of an Associated Press story about expensive soup. Thornbladh was sent by Schembechler to get 15 tuna fish sandwiches and 15 cups of soup for the coaching staff. Thornbladh placed the order at a nearby restaurant and came back later to pick it up. The bill came to $50.56, and Thornbladh did not have enough money. In order to avoid losing the entire sale, the restaurant agreed to sell him the 15 sandwiches without soup for $28. After hearing the story, Schembechler sent him back to the restaurant the next day to buy a single order of soup, wanting to find out how "$2 soup-to-go" tastes.

In 1980, Thornbladh was promoted to assistant coach at Michigan, a position that he held until 1986.

=== Later years and family ===
After retiring from coaching, Thornbladh became the color commentator on WJR radio broadcasts of Michigan Wolverines football games.
