= Wayne Duke =

Wayne Duke (November 9, 1928 – March 29, 2017) was an American collegiate sports executive who served as commissioner of the Big Eight Conference from 1963 to 1971, then as commissioner of the Big Ten Conference from 1971 to 1989.

== Biography ==
=== Early life and education ===
A native of Burlington, Iowa, Wayne Duke graduated from the University of Iowa in 1950. He married Martha Buesch on June 11, 1950. He died on March 29, 2017.

=== Career ===
Duke began his career in college athletics publicity at the University of Northern Iowa and the University of Colorado. He joined the National Collegiate Athletic Association in 1952 as assistant to executive director Walter Byers. He was named commissioner of the Big Eight athletic conference in 1963 and served until 1971, when he was named commissioner of the Big Ten athletic conference. He retired as the Big Ten commissioner in 1989.

A Big Ten scholarship for post-graduate studies is now awarded in his name.

== Awards and honors ==
- 1990: Distinguished Alumni Award, University of Iowa
- 2010: inductee, National Collegiate Basketball Hall of Fame
