= Dennis Franklin =

American football player (born 1953)

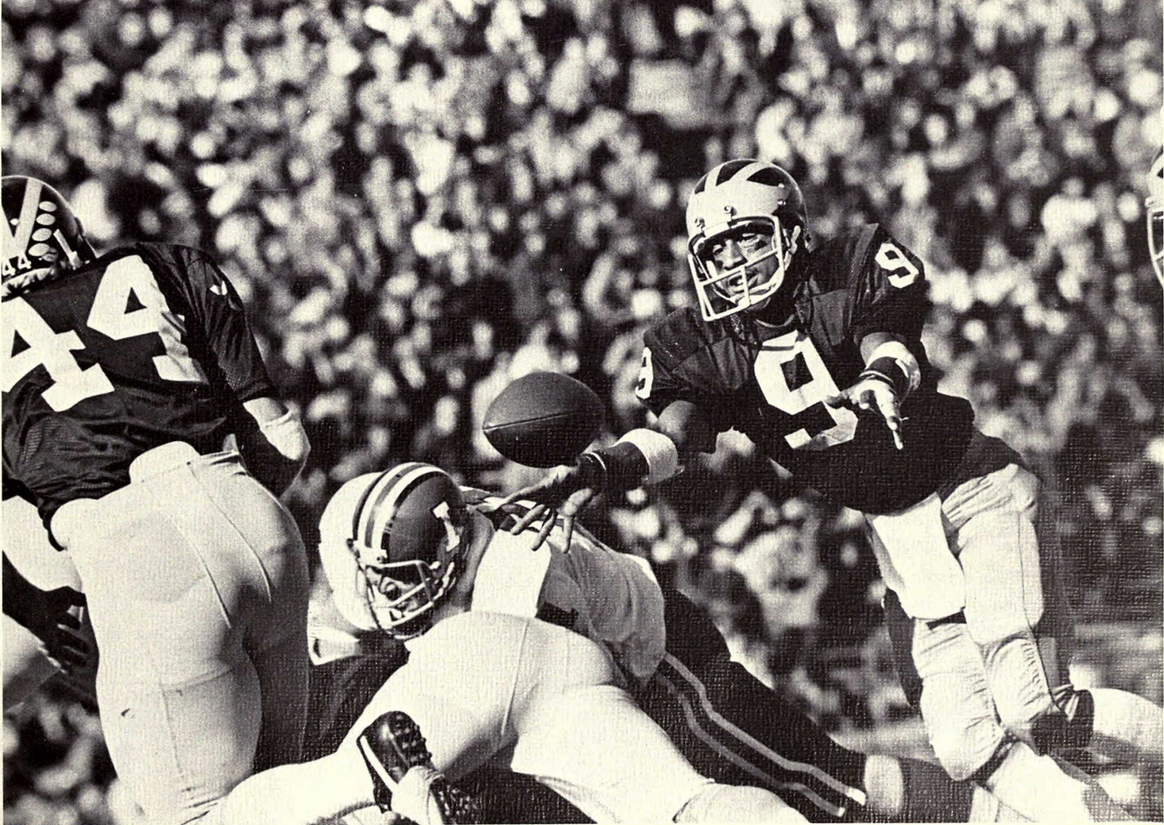
- Franklin laterals to Chuck Heater, 1973

No. 9, 89
- Positions: Quarterback, wide receiver

Personal information
- Born: August 24, 1953 (age 73); Massillon, Ohio, U.S.
- Listed height: 6 ft 1 in (1.85 m)
- Listed weight: 185 lb (84 kg)

Career information
- High school: Massillon Washington
- College: Michigan
- NFL draft: 1975: 6th round, 144th overall pick

Career history
- Detroit Lions (1975–1976)

Awards and highlights
- First-team All-Big Ten (1973); 2× Second-team All-Big Ten (1972, 1974)

Career NFL statistics
- Receptions: 6
- Receiving yards: 125
- Stats at Pro Football Reference

Dennis E. Franklin (born August 24, 1953) is an American former professional football player who was a wide receiver for the Detroit Lions of the National Football League (NFL). He was selected by the Lions in the 1975 NFL draft. Prior to playing in the NFL, he played college football as a quarterback for the Michigan Wolverines from 1971 to 1974. He was their starter from 1972 to 1974. He was recruited by Michigan after starring for the Massillon High School football team in Ohio. Franklin is known as Michigan's first black quarterback.

== High school ==
Before attending the University of Michigan, Franklin drew attention as the talented quarterback of the 1970 Massillon High School Tigers football team. With Franklin at quarterback, the Massillon Tigers outscored opponents, 412–29, and rushed for nearly 3,000 yards (including 363 yards by Franklin) in one season. Franklin also passed for 699 yards, 21.2 yards per completion and 13 touchdowns. The team had major college football talent. He ran an offense that played eight future NCAA Division I players, including Steve Luke (Ohio State Buckeyes), Larry Harper (Miami Redskins, now RedHawks), Mike Mauger (Wisconsin Badgers, Kent State Golden Flashes) and Willie Spencer (World Football League). Franklin's older brothers, Walter and Ed, had won state championships with Massillon. In July 2007, he was inducted into the Stark County High School Football Hall of Fame.

== College ==
After graduating from Massillon, Franklin wore #9 for the Michigan Wolverines football program from 1972 to 1974, and he became known as "Michigan's first black quarterback" in mass media: "Every time I'd do an interview, they'd throw that tag on me. It became annoying," Franklin said. "Eventually, it went away. That's all I ever strived for."

Franklin was a member of the Michigan teams coached by Bo Schembechler from 1971 to 1974 and was the starting quarterback from 1972 to 1974. Under Franklin’s leadership at quarterback, Michigan tied with Ohio State for three consecutive Big Ten Conference titles from 1972 to 1974 and finished with 30 wins, 2 losses and 1 tie. Franklin was a First-team All Big Ten quarterback in 1974 and led the team in passing and total offense every year from 1972 to 1974, becoming the second player at Michigan since Tom Harmon to accomplish that feat for three consecutive years.

Franklin was voted team captain in 1974, was an Honorable Mention All American and finished sixth in the 1974 Heisman Trophy balloting. Franklin also won the 1974 Meyer Morton award, given by the M Club of Chicago for the football player who shows the greatest development and most promise as a result of spring practice and the 1972 John Maulbetsch Award, which is given to the freshman football candidate after spring practice on the basis of desire, character, capacity for leadership and future success both on and off the gridiron.

Franklin is remembered for his role in the classic 1973 Michigan vs. Ohio State football game. When the teams met, both teams were unbeaten with Ohio State ranked No. 1, and Michigan No. 4. Michigan had outscored its opponents 320–58, Ohio State by a margin of 361–33. After an epic struggle, the game ended in a 10–10 tie. Ohio State had gone to the Rose Bowl the year before, which normally would have given Michigan the tie-breaker edge. After some deliberation, the Big Ten athletic directors picked the Buckeyes. There were several explanations including that Franklin broke his collarbone in the game, that the Wolverines failed to win on their home field, and that Ohio State had entered the game as the higher ranked team.

=== Career passing statistics ===
Season	Att	Comp	TD	Comp %	Yds	Yds/Comp	Int	Long
1972	123	59	6	48.0	818	13.9	2	52
1973	67	36	4	53.7	534	14.8	5	46
1974	104	58	8	55.8	933	16.1	5	5
Career total	294	153	18	52.0	2285	14.9	12	52

=== Career rushing statistics ===
Season	Att	Yd+	Yd-	Net Yd	Yd/Att	TD	Long
1972	142	654	157	497	3.5	5	29
1973	101	530	105	425	4.2	6	49
1974	108	425	135	290	2.7	5	20
Career total	351	1609	397	1212	3.5	16	49

== Professional career ==
Drafted by the Detroit Lions in the sixth round of the 1975 NFL draft, Franklin converted to wide receiver for the 1975 NFL season. While Franklin was with Detroit, Greg Landry and Bill Munson were the Lions' quarterbacks. Franklin had a brief NFL career that lasted nine games and that totaled six catches over two years.

After retiring from football, Franklin rose to vice president at King World Productions in New York City, a television distributor that produced Wheel of Fortune, Jeopardy!, and Oprah. He now lives in Santa Monica, California, and sells real estate. Franklin's son Kenny followed his father to Michigan and has aspired toward acting with appearances in Cosmopolitan and S.W.A.T..

== See also ==
- Michigan Wolverines football statistical leaders
