= 1973 Big Ten Conference football season =

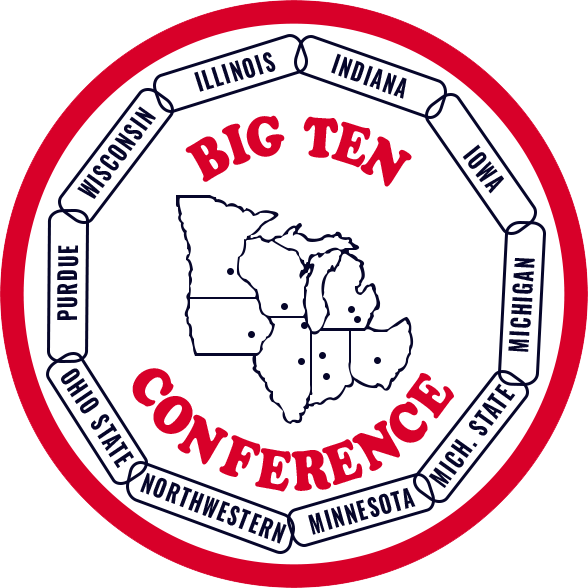
- Sport: American football
- Teams: 10
- Top draft pick: John Hicks
- Co-champions: Michigan, Ohio State
- Runners-up: Minnesota
- Season MVP: Archie Griffin

Seasons
- 1972 1974

1973 Big Ten Conference football standings
	Conf.					Overall
Team	W		L		T	W		L		T
No. 2 Ohio State +	7	–	0	–	1	10	–	0	–	1
No. 6 Michigan +	7	–	0	–	1	10	–	0	–	1
Minnesota	6	–	2	–	0	7	–	4	–	0
Illinois	4	–	4	–	0	5	–	6	–	0
Michigan State	4	–	4	–	0	5	–	6	–	0
Purdue	4	–	4	–	0	5	–	6	–	0
Northwestern	4	–	4	–	0	4	–	7	–	0
Wisconsin	3	–	5	–	0	4	–	7	–	0
Indiana	0	–	8	–	0	2	–	9	–	0
Iowa	0	–	8	–	0	0	–	11	–	0
+ – Conference co-champions; Rankings from AP Poll

The 1973 Big Ten Conference football season was the 78th season of college football played by the member schools of the Big Ten Conference and was a part of the 1973 NCAA Division I football season.

The 1973 Ohio State Buckeyes football team, under head coach Woody Hayes, and the 1973 Michigan Wolverines football team, under head coach Bo Schembechler, compiled identical 10–0–1 records and tied for the Big Ten championship. Ohio State was ranked No. 2 in the final AP Poll, and Michigan was ranked No. 6. Ohio State led the conference in both scoring offense (37.5 points per game) and scoring defense (5.8 points allowed per game).

The regular season ended with a 10–10 tie between Michigan and Ohio State. When the game ended in a tie, the Big Ten athletic directors voted, 6–4, to send Ohio State to the Rose Bowl. Michigan athletic officials and fans were outraged, with even the Vice President of the United States, Gerald Ford, speaking out against the decision. Ohio State defeated USC, 42–21, in the 1974 Rose Bowl. Two selectors, the National Championship Foundation and the Poling System, recognize Michigan as a co-national champion for the 1973 season.

The Big Ten statistical leaders in 1973 included Ohio State running back Archie Griffin with 1,577 rushing yards. Griffin also won the Chicago Tribune Silver Football as the Big Ten's most valuable player. Four Big Ten players were recognized as consensus first-team All-Americans: Randy Gradishar and John Hicks of Ohio State and Dave Gallagher and Dave Brown of Michigan.

== Season overview ==
=== Results and team statistics ===
Conf. Rank	Team	Head coach	AP final	AP high	Overall record	Conf. record	PPG	PAG	MVP
1 (tie)	Ohio State	Woody Hayes	#2	#1	10–0–1	7–0–1	**37.5**	**5.8**	**Archie Griffin**
1 (tie)	Michigan	Bo Schembechler	#6	#4	10–0–1	7–0–1	30.0	6.2	Paul Seal
3	Minnesota	Cal Stoll	NR	NR	7–4	6–2	23.6	26.8	Steve Neils
4 (tie)	Illinois	Bob Blackman	NR	NR	5–6	4–4	14.9	14.3	Octavus Morgan
4 (tie)	Michigan State	Denny Stolz	NR	NR	5–6	4–4	10.4	14.9	Ray Nester
4 (tie)	Purdue	Alex Agase	NR	NR	6–5	6–2	18.2	19.4	Bo Bobrowski
4 (tie)	Northwestern	John Pont	NR	NR	4–7	4–4	17.1	27.2	Stan Kay
8	Wisconsin	John Jardine	NR	NR	4–7	3–5	19.6	21.5	Mike Webster
9 (tie)	Indiana	Lee Corso	NR	NR	2–9	0–8	13.7	24.6	Chuck Sukurs
9 (tie)	Iowa	Frank Lauterbur	NR	NR	0–11	0–8	12.7	36.5	Brian Rollins

Key
AP final = Team's rank in the final AP Poll of the 1973 season
AP high = Team's highest rank in the AP Poll throughout the 1973 season
PPG = Average of points scored per game; conference leader's average displayed in bold
PAG = Average of points allowed per game; conference leader's average displayed in bold
MVP = Most valuable player as voted by players on each team as part of the voting process to determine the winner of the Chicago Tribune Silver Football trophy; trophy winner in bold

=== Pre-season ===
Four Big Ten teams changed head coaches between the 1972 and 1973 seasons, as follows:

- Duffy Daugherty retired as Michigan State's head football coach at the end of the 1972 season. Denny Stolz, who had been the Spartans' defensive coordinator for two years, took over as head coach.
- Bob DeMoss was replaced by Alex Agase as Purdue's head coach. Agase had been Northwestern's head coach from 1964 to 1972.
- Agase was replaced as Northwestern's head coach by John Pont. Pont had been Indiana's head coach from 1965 to 1972.
- Pont was replaced as Indiana's head coach by Lee Corso. Corso had been the head coach at Louisville from 1969 to 1972.

=== Regular season ===
==== September 15 ====
On September 15, 1973, the Big Ten football teams opened the season with five conference games.

- Ohio State 56, Minnesota 7
- Michigan 31, Iowa 7
- Illinois 28, Indiana 14
- Northwestern 14, Michigan State 10
- Purdue 14, Wisconsin 13

==== September 22 ====
On September 22, 1973, the Big Ten teams played nine non-conference games, resulting in four wins and five losses. Ohio State had a bye week.

- Michigan 47, Stanford 10
- Minnesota 41, North Dakota 14
- Illinois 27, California 7
- Michigan State 14, Syracuse 8
- Miami (OH) 24, Purdue 19
- Colorado 28, Wisconsin 25
- Notre Dame 44, Northwestern 0
- UCLA 55, Iowa 18
- Arizona 26, Indiana 10

==== September 29 ====
On September 29, 1973, the Big Ten teams played 10 non-conference games, resulting in three wins and seven losses.

- Ohio State 37, TCU 3
- Michigan 14, Navy 0
- Kansas 34, Minnesota 19
- West Virginia 17, Illinois 10
- UCLA 34, Michigan State 21
- Notre Dame 20, Purdue 7
- Nebraska 20, Wisconsin 16
- Pittsburgh 21, Northwestern 14
- Penn State 27, Iowa 8
- Indiana 17, Kentucky 3

==== October 6 ====
On October 6, 1973, the Big Ten teams played 10 non-conference games, resulting in five wins and five losses. After concluding three weeks of non-conference play, the Big Ten teams had compiled a 12–17 non-conference record.

- Ohio State 27, Washington State 3
- Michigan 24, Oregon 0
- Nebraska 48, Minnesota 7
- Stanford 24, Illinois 0
- Notre Dame 14, Michigan State 10
- Purdue 27, Duke 7
- Wisconsin 37, Wyoming 28
- Ohio 14, Northwestern 12
- Arizona 23, Iowa 20
- Indiana 28, West Virginia 14

==== October 13 ====
On October 13, 1973, the Big Ten teams played five conference games.

- Ohio State 24, Wisconsin 0
- Michigan 31, Michigan State 0
- Minnesota 24, Indiana 3
- Illinois 15, Purdue 13
- Northwestern 31, Iowa 15

==== October 20 ====
On October 20, 1973, the Big Ten teams played five conference games.

- Ohio State 37, Indiana 7
- Michigan 35, Wisconsin 6
- Minnesota 31, Iowa 23
- Illinois 6, Michigan State 3
- Purdue 21, Northwestern 10

==== October 27 ====
On October 27, 1973, the Big Ten teams played five conference games.

- Ohio State 60, Northwestern 0
- Michigan 34, Minnesota 7
- Illinois 50, Iowa 0
- Michigan State 10, Purdue 7
- Wisconsin 31, Indiana 7

==== November 3 ====
On November 3, 1973, the Big Ten teams played five conference games.

- Ohio State 30, Illinois 0
- Michigan 49, Indiana 13
- Minnesota 52, Northwestern 43
- Michigan State 21, Wisconsin 0
- Purdue 48, Iowa 23

==== November 10 ====
On November 10, 1973, the Big Ten teams played five conference games.

- Ohio State 35, Michigan State 0
- Michigan 21, Illinois 6
- Minnesota 34, Purdue 7
- Wisconsin 35, Iowa 7
- Northwestern 21, Indiana 20

==== November 17 ====
On November 17, 1973, the Big Ten teams played five conference games.

- Ohio State 55, Iowa 13
- Michigan 34, Purdue 9
- Minnesota 19, Illinois 16
- Michigan State 10, Indiana 9
- Wisconsin 36, Northwestern 34

==== November 24 ====
On November 24, 1973, the Big Ten teams played five conference games.

- Michigan 10, Ohio State 10
- Minnesota 19, Wisconsin 17
- Northwestern 9, Illinois 6
- Michigan State 15, Iowa 6
- Purdue 28, Indiana 23

=== Bowl games ===
On January 1, 1974, Ohio State (ranked No. 4 in the AP Poll) defeated USC (ranked No. 7), 42–21. Pete Johnson scored three touchdowns, and Archie Griffin capped the scoring with a 47-yard touchdown run in the fourth quarter.

== Statistical leaders ==
=== Passing yards ===
1. Mitch Anderson, Northwestern (1,224)
2. Gregg Bohlig, Wisconsin (1,211)
3. Jeff Hollenbach, Illinois (916)
4. Willie Jones, Indiana (881)
5. Bo Bobrowski, Purdue (849)

=== Rushing yards ===
1. Archie Griffin, Ohio State (1,577)
2. Billy Marek, Wisconsin (1,207)
3. Stan Key, Northwestern (894)
4. Rick Upchurch, Minnesota (841)
5. Ed Shuttlesworth, Michigan (745)

=== Receiving yards ===
1. Trent Smock, Indiana (505)
2. Steve Craig, Northwestern (479)
3. Garvin Roberson, Illinois (416)
3. Mike Flanagan, Indiana (416)
5. Brian Rollins, Iowa (408)

=== Total offense ===
1. Bo Bobrowski, Purdue (274)
2. Mitch Anderson, Northwestern (253)
3. Archie Griffin, Ohio State (247)
4. Billy Marek, Wisconsin (241)
5. Jeff Hollenbach, Illinois (233)

=== Passing efficiency rating ===
1. Gregg Bohlig, Wisconsin (112.9)
2. Mitch Anderson, Northwestern (109.3)
3. Jeff Hollenbach, Illinois (79.5)

=== Rushing yards per attempts ===
1. Archie Griffin, Ohio State (6.4)
2. Rick Upchurch, Minnesota (6.0)
3. Chuck Heater, Michigan (5.8)
4. Cornelius Greene, Ohio State (5.7)
5. Ken Starch, Wisconsin (5.4)

=== Yards per reception ===
1. Garvin Roberson, Illinois (16.6)
2. Steve Craig, Northwestern (16.0)
3. Trent Smock, Indiana (14.0)
4. Mike Flanagan, Indiana (12.6)
5. Brian Rollins, Iowa (12.4)

=== Points scored ===
1. Billy Marek, Wisconsin (84)
1. Bruce Elia, Ohio State (84)
3. Cornelius Greene, Ohio State (72)
4. Rick Upchurch, Minnesota (54)
4. Ed Shuttlesworth, Michigan (54)

== Awards and honors ==
=== All-Big Ten honors ===
The following players were picked by the Associated Press (AP) and/or the United Press International (UPI) as first-team players on the 1973 All-Big Ten Conference football team.

Offense

Position	Name	Team	Selectors
Quarterback	Dennis Franklin	Michigan	AP, UPI
Running back	Archie Griffin	Ohio State	AP, UPI
Running back	Ed Shuttlesworth	Michigan	AP, UPI
Running back	Billy Marek	Wisconsin	AP
End	Steve Craig	Northwestern	AP, UPI [tight end]
End	Brian Rollins	Iowa	AP [end]
Split end	Garvin Roberson	Illinois	UPI [split end]
Flanker	Clint Haslerig	Michigan	UPI [flanker]
Tackle	John Hicks	Ohio State	AP, UPI
Tackle	Kurt Schumacher	Ohio State	UPI
Tackle	Keith Fahnhorst	Minnesota	AP
Guard	Mike Hoban	Michigan	AP, UPI
Guard	Jim Kregel	Ohio State	AP, UPI
Center	Mike Webster	Wisconsin	AP, UPI

Defense

Position	Name	Team	Selectors
Defensive line	Van DeCree	Ohio State	AP [front 5], UPI [def. end]
Defensive line	Steve Neils	Minnesota	AP [front 5], UPI [def. end]
Defensive line	Pete Cusick	Ohio State	AP [front 5], UPI [def. tackle]
Defensive line	Dave Gallagher	Michigan	AP [front 5], UPI [def. tackle]
Defensive line	Vic Koegel	Ohio State	UPI [guard]
Defensive line	Octavus Morgan	Illinois	AP [front 5]
Linebacker	Randy Gradishar	Ohio State	AP, UPI
Linebacker	Rick Middleton	Ohio State	AP, UPI
Linebacker	Mike Varty	Northwestern	AP
Defensive back	Dave Brown	Michigan	AP, UPI
Defensive back	Neal Colzie	Ohio State	AP, UPI
Defensive back	Mike Gow	Illinois	AP, UPI
Defensive back	Bill Simpson	Michigan State	UPI

=== All-American honors ===
At the end of the 1973 season, Big Ten players secured four of the consensus first-team picks for the 1973 College Football All-America Team. The Big Ten's consensus All-Americans were:

Position	Name	Team	Selectors
Linebacker	Randy Gradishar	Ohio State	AFCA, AP, FWAA, NEA, UPI, WCFF, FN, Time, TSN
Offensive guard	John Hicks	Ohio State	AFCA, AP, FWAA, NEA, UPI, WCFF, FN, Time, TSN
Defensive end	Dave Gallagher	Michigan	AFCA, AP, FWAA, NEA, WCFF, Time, TSN
Defensive back	Dave Brown	Michigan	AFCA, FWAA, UPI

Other Big Ten players who were named first-team All-Americans by at least one selector were:

Position	Name	Team	Selectors
Running back	Archie Griffin	Ohio State	UPI
Defensive end	Van DeCree	Ohio State	UPI, FN
Defensive back	Bill Simpson	Michigan State	TSN
Defensive back	Carl Capria	Purdue	TSN
Placekicker	Mike Lantry	Michigan	FN

=== Other awards ===
Three Ohio State players finished among the top six in the voting for the 1973 Heisman Trophy: John Hicks (second); Archie Griffin (fifth); and Randy Gradishar (sixth).

== 1974 NFL draft ==
The 1974 NFL draft was held in New York on January 29–30, 1974. The following players were among the first 100 picks:

Name	Position	Team	Round	Overall pick
John Hicks	Guard	Ohio State	1	3
Carl Barzilauskas	Defensive Tackle	Indiana	1	6
Rick Middleton	Linebacker	Ohio State	1	13
Randy Gradishar	Linebacker	Ohio State	1	14
Dave Gallagher	Defensive End	Michigan	1	20
Keith Fahnhorst	Tight end	Minnesota	2	35
Paul Seal	Tight end	Michigan	2	36
Ed Shuttlesworth	Running back	Michigan	2	37
Bill Simpson	Defensive back	Michigan State	2	50
Steve Craig	Tight end	Northwestern	3	64
Clint Haslerig	Wide receiver	Michigan	4	83
Morris Bradshaw	Wide receiver	Ohio State	4	93
Matt Herkenhoff	Tackle	Minnesota	4	94
