= 1973 Ohio State Buckeyes football team =

American college football season

1973 Ohio State Buckeyes football
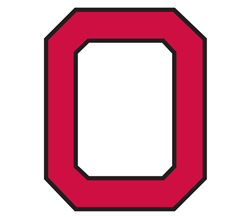

Big Ten co-champion Rose Bowl champion National Champion (NCF, PS, R(FACT), SR)

Rose Bowl, W 42–21 vs. USC
- Conference: Big Ten Conference

Ranking
- Coaches: No. 3
- AP: No. 2
- Record: 10–0–1 (7–0–1 Big Ten)
- Head coach: Woody Hayes (23rd season)
- Defensive coordinator: George Hill (3rd season)
- MVP: Archie Griffin
- Captains: Greg Hare; Rick Middleton
- Home stadium: Ohio Stadium

1973 Big Ten Conference football standings
	Conf.					Overall
Team	W		L		T	W		L		T
No. 2 Ohio State +	7	–	0	–	1	10	–	0	–	1
No. 6 Michigan +	7	–	0	–	1	10	–	0	–	1
Minnesota	6	–	2	–	0	7	–	4	–	0
Illinois	4	–	4	–	0	5	–	6	–	0
Michigan State	4	–	4	–	0	5	–	6	–	0
Purdue	4	–	4	–	0	5	–	6	–	0
Northwestern	4	–	4	–	0	4	–	7	–	0
Wisconsin	3	–	5	–	0	4	–	7	–	0
Indiana	0	–	8	–	0	2	–	9	–	0
Iowa	0	–	8	–	0	0	–	11	–	0
+ – Conference co-champions; Rankings from AP Poll

The 1973 Ohio State Buckeyes football team represented the Ohio State University in the 1973 Big Ten Conference football season. The Buckeyes compiled a 10–0–1 record, including the 1974 Rose Bowl in Pasadena, California, where they won, 42–21, against the USC Trojans. The Ohio State Buckeyes were named national champion by the National Championship Foundation, Poling System, David Rothman (statistician) and the Sagarin Ratings, but this championship is not claimed by Ohio State.

== Schedule ==
Date	Time	Opponent	Rank	Site	TV	Result	Attendance	Source
September 15	1:30 p.m.	Minnesota	No. 3	Ohio Stadium; Columbus, OH		W 56–7	86,005	
September 29	1:30 p.m.	TCU*	No. 3	Ohio Stadium; Columbus, OH		W 37–3	87,439	
October 6	1:30 p.m.	Washington State*	No. 1	Ohio Stadium; Columbus, OH		W 27–3	87,425	
October 13	2:00 p.m.	at Wisconsin	No. 1	Camp Randall Stadium; Madison, WI		W 24–0	77,413	
October 20	1:30 p.m.	at Indiana	No. 1	Memorial Stadium; Bloomington, IN		W 37–7	53,183	
October 27	1:30 p.m.	Northwestern^{†}	No. 1	Ohio Stadium; Columbus, OH		W 60–0	87,453	
November 3	2:00 p.m.	at Illinois	No. 1	Memorial Stadium; Champaign, IL (Illibuck)		W 30–0	60,707	
November 10	1:30 p.m.	Michigan State	No. 1	Ohio Stadium; Columbus, OH		W 35–0	87,600	
November 17	1:30 p.m.	Iowa	No. 1	Ohio Stadium; Columbus, OH		W 55–13	87,447	
November 24	12:30 p.m.	at No. 4 Michigan	No. 1	Michigan Stadium; Ann Arbor, MI (rivalry)	ABC	T 10–10	105,223	
January 1, 1974	5:00 p.m.	vs. No. 7 USC*	No. 4	Rose Bowl; Pasadena, CA (Rose Bowl)	NBC	W 42–21	105,267	
*Non-conference game; ^{†}Homecoming; Rankings from AP Poll released prior to the game; All times are in Eastern time; Source:

== Game summaries ==
=== Minnesota ===
Minnesota Golden Gophers (0–0) at #3 Ohio State Buckeyes (0–0)

Quarter	1	2	3	4	Total
Minnesota	0	7	0	0	7
Ohio State	14	21	7	14	56

at Ohio Stadium, Columbus, Ohio

- Date: September 15
- Game weather: 74 °F (23 °C)
- Game attendance: 86,005

Game information

First quarter

- OSU – Champ Henson 2-yard run (Blair Conway kick), 10:24. Ohio State 7–0. Drive:
- OSU – Cornelius Greene 4-yard run (Blair Conway kick), 8:44. Ohio State 14–0. Drive:

Second quarter

- MINN – John King 1-yard run (Steve Goldberg kick), 12:59. Ohio State 14–7. Drive:
- OSU – Archie Griffin 93-yard kickoff return (Blair Conway kick), 12:45. Ohio State 21–7.
- OSU – Champ Henson 2-yard run (Blair Conway kick), 0:51. Ohio State 28–7. Drive:
- OSU – Brian Baschnagel 5-yard run (Blair Conway kick), 0:00. Ohio State 35–7. Drive:

Third quarter

- OSU – Neal Colzie 78-yard punt return (Blair Conway kick), 5:36. Ohio State 42–7.

Fourth quarter

- OSU – Champ Henson 1-yard run (Blair Conway kick), 10:39. Ohio State 49–7. Drive:
- OSU – Billy Ezzo 55-yard pass from Greg Hare (Blair Conway kick), 1:51. Ohio State 56–7. Drive:

Top passers

- MINN – John Lawing – 5/9, 31 yards, INT
- OSU – Greg Hare – 2/2, 64 yards, TD

Top rushers

- MINN – John King – 17 rushes, 51 yards, TD
- OSU – Archie Griffin – 15 rushes, 129 yards

Top receivers

- MINN – Keith Fahnhorst – 3 receptions, 23 yards
- OSU – Billy Ezzo – 1 reception, 55 yards, TD

=== TCU ===
TCU Horned Frogs (1–0) at #3 Ohio State Buckeyes (1–0)

Quarter	1	2	3	4	Total
TCU	0	3	0	0	3
Ohio State	14	17	0	6	37

at Ohio Stadium, Columbus, Ohio

- Date: September 29
- Game time: 1:30 p.m.
- Game weather: Rain, 78 °F (26 °C)
- Game attendance: 87,439

Game information

First quarter

- OSU – Archie Griffin 68-yard run (Blair Conway kick), 12:17. Ohio State 7–0. Drive:
- OSU – Champ Henson 1-yard run (Blair Conway kick), 4:42. Ohio State 14–0. Drive: 69 yards.

Second quarter

- TCU – Berl Simmons 23-yard field goal, 9:18. Ohio State 14–3. Drive:
- OSU – Cornelius Greene 72-yard run (Blair Conway kick), 9:02. Ohio State 21–3. Drive:
- OSU – Cornelius Greene 8-yard run (Blair Conway kick), 2:33. Ohio State 28–3. Drive:
- OSU – Blair Conway 37-yard field goal, 0:00. Ohio State 31–3. Drive:

Third quarter

- No scoring

Fourth quarter

- OSU – Fred Pagac 13-yard pass from Greg Hare (kick failed), 6:25. Ohio State 37–3. Drive:

Top passers

- TCU – Kent Marshall – 7/17, 54 yards
- OSU – Cornelius Greene – 3/6, 34 yards, INT

Top rushers

- TCU – Mike Luttrell – 14 rushes, 44 yards
- OSU – Archie Griffin – 14 rushes, 119 yards, TD

Top receivers

- TCU — John Ott – 2 receptions, 20 yards
- OSU – Ted Powell – 1 reception, 22 yards

- Cornelius Greene 15 Rush, 113 Yds
- Champ Henson tore a knee ligament during the game

=== Washington State ===
Washington State Cougars (1–2) at #1 Ohio State Buckeyes (2–0)

Quarter	1	2	3	4	Total
Washington State	0	3	0	0	3
Ohio State	0	14	13	0	27

at Ohio Stadium, Columbus, Ohio

- Date: October 6
- Game weather: Sunny, 65 °F (18 °C)
- Game attendance: 87425

Game information

First quarter

- No scoring

Second quarter

- OSU – Bruce Elia 17-yard run (kick failed), 7:14. Ohio State 6–0. Drive: 7 plays, 80 yards.
- OSU – Archie Griffin 6-yard pass from Cornelius Greene (pass good), 3:20. Ohio State 14–0. Drive: 9 plays, 77 yards.
- WSU – Joe Danelo 41-yard field goal, 0:22. Ohio State 14–3. Drive: 40 yards.

Third quarter

- OSU – Archie Griffin 26-yard run (kick blocked), 9:21. Ohio State 20–3. Drive: 12 plays, 84 yards.
- OSU – Bruce Elia 9-yard run (Blair Conway kick), 5:13. Ohio State 27–3. Drive: 3 plays, 33 yards.

Fourth quarter

- No scoring

Top passers

- WSU – Wally Bennett – 7/11, 50 yards, INT
- OSU – Cornelius Greene – 3/6, 62 yards, TD, INT

Top rushers

- WSU – Andrew Jones – 17 rushes, 64 yards
- OSU – Archie Griffin – 15 rushes, 128 yards, TD

Top receivers

- WSU – Fritz Brayton – 6 receptions, 45 yards
- OSU – Dave Hazel – 1 reception, 49 yards

External videos
- 1973 Ohio State vs. Washington State - silent game film

=== At Wisconsin ===
#1 Ohio State Buckeyes (3–0) at Wisconsin Badgers (1–3)

Quarter	1	2	3	4	Total
Ohio State	7	0	7	10	24
Wisconsin	0	0	0	0	0

at Camp Randall Stadium, Madison, Wisconsin

- Date: October 13
- Game time: 1:00 p.m.
- Game weather: Sunny, 68 °F (20 °C)
- Game attendance: 77,413
- Referee: Glenn Fortin

Game information

First quarter

- OSU – Bruce Elia 1-yard run (Blair Conway kick), 0:18. Ohio State 7–0. Drive:

Second quarter

- No scoring

Third quarter

- OSU – Cornelius Greene 2-yard run (Blair Conway kick), 11:29. Ohio State 14–0. Drive:

Fourth quarter

- OSU – Blair Conway 36-yard field goal, 11:12. Ohio State 17–0. Drive:
- OSU – Bruce Elia 1-yard run (Blair Conway kick), 5:09. Ohio State 24–0. Drive:

Top passers

- OSU – Cornelius Greene – 1/6, 22 yard, INT
- WIS – Gregg Bohlig – 9/18, 98 yards, INT

Top rushers

- OSU – Archie Griffin – 29 rushes, 169 yards, TD
- WIS – Billy Marek – 13 rushes, 49 yards

Top receivers

- OSU – Fred Pagac – 1 reception, 22 yards
- WIS – Art Sanger – 2 receptions, 35 yards

=== At Indiana ===
#1 Ohio State Buckeyes (4–0) at Indiana Hoosiers (2–3)

Quarter	1	2	3	4	Total
Ohio State	7	17	7	6	37
Indiana	0	0	0	7	7

at Memorial Stadium, Bloomington, Indiana

- Date: October 20
- Game time: 1:30 p.m.
- Game weather: Clear, 65 °F (18 °C)
- Game attendance: 53,183

Game information

First quarter

- OSU – Cornelius Greene 6-yard run (Blair Conway kick), 7:29. Ohio State 7–0. Drive:

Second quarter

- OSU – Blair Conway 37-yard field goal, 13:05. Ohio State 10–0. Drive:
- OSU – Cornelius Greene 11-yard run (Blair Conway kick), 4:26. Ohio State 17–0. Drive:
- OSU – Bruce Elia 3-yard run (Blair Conway kick), 0:36. Ohio State 24–0. Drive:

Third quarter

- OSU – Neal Colzie 55-yard interception return (Blair Conway kick), 14:14. Ohio State 31–0.

Fourth quarter

- IND – Trent Smock 51-yard pass from Mike Flanagan (Frank Stavroff kick), 7:50. Ohio State 31–7. Drive:
- OSU – Bruce Elia 1-yard run (kick failed), 3:18. Ohio State 37–7. Drive:

Top passers

- OSU – Greg Hare – 1/2, 39 yards
- IND – Mike Glazier – 9/18, 84 yards, 2 INT

Top rushers

- OSU – Archie Griffin – 25 rushes, 130 yards
- IND – Courtney Snyder – 16 rushes, 81 yards

Top receivers

- OSU – John Smurda – 2 receptions, 42 yards
- IND – Trent Smock – 4 receptions, 70 yards, TD

- Bruce Elia 24 rushes, 123 yards

=== Northwestern ===
Northwestern Wildcats (2–4) at #1 Ohio State Buckeyes (5–0)

Quarter	1	2	3	4	Total
Northwestern	0	0	0	0	0
Ohio State	0	27	26	7	60

at Ohio Stadium, Columbus, Ohio

- Date: October 27
- Game time: 1:35 p.m.
- Game weather: Cloudy, 61 °F (16 °C)
- Game attendance: 87,453

Game information

First quarter

- No scoring

Second quarter

- OSU – Cornelius Greene 2-yard run (Blair Conway kick), 9:10. Ohio State 7–0. Drive:
- OSU – Archie Griffin 18-yard run (Blair Conway kick), 6:40. Ohio State 14–0. Drive:
- OSU – Tim Fox 20-yard blocked punt return (kick failed), 5:21. Ohio State 20–0.
- OSU – Brian Baschnagel 4-yard run (Blair Conway kick), 1:27. Ohio State 27–0. Drive:

Third quarter

- OSU – Neal Colzie 19-yard interception return (Blair Conway kick), 14:49. Ohio State 34–0.
- OSU – Cornelius Greene 55-yard run (Blair Conway kick), 11:36. Ohio State 41–0. Drive:
- OSU – Archie Griffin 2-yard run (kick failed), 7:39. Ohio State 47–0. Drive:
- OSU – Elmer Lippert 5-yard run (kick failed), 3:09. Ohio State 53–0. Drive:

Fourth quarter

- OSU – Morris Bradshaw 8-yard pass from Greg Hare (Blair Conway kick), 11:13. Ohio State 60–0. Drive:

Top passers

- NW – Mitch Anderson – 3/9, 37 yards, 2 INT
- OSU – Greg Hare – 4/6, 71 yards, TD

Top rushers

- NW – Jim Trimble – 8 rushes, 36 yards
- OSU – Archie Griffin – 17 rushes, 105 yards, 2 TD

Top receivers

- NW – Steve Harris – 2 receptions, 29 yards
- OSU – Tim Holycross – 2 receptions, 60 yards

=== At Illinois ===
#1 Ohio State Buckeyes (6–0) at Illinois Fighting Illini (5–2)

Quarter	1	2	3	4	Total
Ohio State	3	0	7	20	30
Illinois	0	0	0	0	0

at Memorial Stadium, Champaign, Illinois

- Date: November 3
- Game time: 1:00 p.m. CST
- Game weather: Clear, 53 °F (12 °C)
- Game attendance: 60,707

Game information

First quarter

- OSU – Blair Conway 25-yard field goal, 7:18. Ohio State 3–0.

Second quarter

- No scoring

Third quarter

- OSU – Archie Griffin 1-yard run (Blair Conway kick), 5:14. Ohio State 10–0. Drive: 41 yards.

Fourth quarter

- OSU – Cornelius Greene 7-yard run (kick failed), 14:15. Ohio State 16–0. Drive: 16 yards.
- OSU – Cornelius Greene 1-yard run (Blair Conway kick), 10:36. Ohio State 23–0. Drive: 31 yards.
- OSU – Pete Johnson 2-yard run (Blair Conway kick), 5:42. Ohio State 30–0. Drive: 31 yards.

Top passers

- OSU – Dave Purdy – 2/4, 18 yards
- ILL – Jeff Hollenbach – 3/11, 27 yards, INT

Top rushers

- OSU – Archie Griffin – 29 rushes, 108 yards
- ILL – Lonnie Perrin – 7 rushes, 34 yards

Top receivers

- OSU – Fred Pagac – 1 reception, 12 yards
- ILL – Garvin Roberson – 2 receptions, 15 yards

=== Michigan State ===
Michigan State Spartans (3–5) at #1 Ohio State Buckeyes (7–0)

Quarter	1	2	3	4	Total
Michigan State	0	0	0	0	0
Ohio State	7	14	7	7	35

at Ohio Stadium, Columbus, Ohio

- Date: November 10
- Game time: 1:30 p.m.
- Game weather: 36 °F (2 °C)
- Game attendance: 87,600

Game information

First quarter

- OSU – Bruce Elia 1-yard run (Blair Conway kick), 3:24. Ohio St 7–0.

Second quarter

- OSU – Bruce Elia 2-yard run (Blair Conway kick), 9:26. Ohio St 14–0.
- OSU – Neal Colzie 43-yard punt return (Blair Conway kick), 2:08. Ohio St 21–0.

Third quarter

- OSU – Bruce Elia 2-yard run (Blair Conway kick), 8:57. Ohio St 28–0.

Fourth quarter

- OSU – Pete Johnson 2-yard run (Blair Conway kick), 13:53. Ohio St 35–0.

Top passers

- MSU – Tyrone Willingham – 1/2, 6 yards
- OSU – Cornelius Greene – 3/6, 31 yards, INT

Top rushers

- MSU – Mike Holt – 13 rushes, 52 yards
- OSU – Archie Griffin – 21 rushes, 131 yards

Top receivers

- MSU – Mike Cobb – 1 reception, 6 yards
- OSU – Elmer Lippert – 1 reception, 20 yards

=== Iowa ===
Iowa Hawkeyes (0–9) at #1 Ohio State Buckeyes (8–0)

Quarter	1	2	3	4	Total
Iowa	0	0	0	13	13
Ohio State	14	13	21	7	55

at Ohio Stadium, Columbus, Ohio

- Date: November 17
- Game time: 12:30 p.m. CST
- Game weather: Clear, 42 °F (6 °C)
- Game attendance: 87,447

Game information

First quarter

- OSU – Bruce Elia 1-yard run (Blair Conway kick), 10:21. Ohio State 7–0.
- OSU – Bruce Elia 1-yard run (Blair Conway kick), 4:30. Ohio State 14–0.

Second quarter

- OSU – Cornelius Greene 1-yard run (kick failed), 2:27. Ohio State 20–0.
- OSU – Dave Hazel 41-yard pass from Cornelius Greene (Blair Conway kick), 0:07. Ohio State 27–0.

Third quarter

- OSU – Bruce Elia 3-yard run (Blair Conway kick), 7:38. Ohio State 34–0.
- OSU – Archie Griffin 8-yard run (Blair Conway kick), 2:49. Ohio State 41–0.
- OSU – Bruce Elia 3-yard run (Blair Conway kick), 0:34. Ohio State 48–0.

Fourth quarter

- IOWA – Bill Schultz 78-yard pass from Butch Caldwell (Harry Kokolus kick), 14:48. Ohio State 48–7.
- IOWA – Rod Wellington 2-yard run (pass failed), 8:22. Ohio State 48–13.
- OSU – Elmer Lippert 12 yard run (Tom Klaban kick), 6:44. Ohio State 55–13.

Top passers

- IOWA – Butch Caldwell – 6/17, 129 yards, TD
- OSU – Cornelius Greene – 1/3, 41 yards

Top rushers

- IOWA – Rod Wellington – 24 rushes, 117 yards
- OSU – Archie Griffin – 30 rushes, 246 yards, TD

Top receiver

- IOWA – Bill Schultz – 1 reception, 78 yards, TD
- OSU – Dave Hazel – 1 reception, 41 yards, TD

=== At Michigan ===
#1 Ohio State Buckeyes (9–0) at #4 Michigan Wolverines (10–0)

Quarter	1	2	3	4	Total
Ohio State	0	10	0	0	10
Michigan	0	0	0	10	10

at Michigan Stadium, Ann Arbor, Michigan

- Date: November 24
- Game time: 12:05 p.m. EST
- Game weather: Cloudy, 50 °F (10 °C)
- Game attendance: 105,223
- TV: ABC

Game information

First quarter

- No scoring

Second quarter

- OSU – Blair Conway 31-yard field goal, 11:04. Ohio State 3–0.
- OSU – Pete Johnson 5-yard run (Blair Conway kick), 0:53. Ohio State 10–0.

Third quarter

- No scoring

Fourth quarter

- MICH – Mike Lantry 30-yard field goal, 14:23. Ohio State 10–3.
- MICH – Dennis Franklin 10-yard run (Mike Lantry kick), 9:32. Tie 10–10.

Top passers

- OSU – Greg Hare – 0/4, INT
- MICH – Dennis Franklin – 7/11, 99 yards, INT

Top rushers

- OSU – Archie Griffin – 30 rushes, 163 yards
- MICH – Ed Shuttlesworth – 27 rushes, 116 yards

Top receivers

- OSU – None
- MICH – Clint Haslerig – 5 receptions, 64 yards

Cornelius Greene played with injured thumb (did not attempt a pass)

=== Rose Bowl (vs. USC) ===
Rose Bowl: #4 Ohio State Buckeyes (9–0–1) vs. #7 USC Trojans (9–1–1)

Quarter	1	2	3	4	Total
USC	3	11	7	0	21
Ohio State	7	7	13	15	42

at Rose Bowl, Pasadena, California

- Date: January 1, 1974
- Game time: 2:00 p.m. PST
- Game attendance: 105,267
- TV announcers (NBC): Curt Gowdy and Al DeRogatis

Game information

First quarter

- USC – Chip Limahelu 47-yard field goal, 12:27. USC 3–0.
- OSU – Pete Johnson 1-yard run (Blair Conway kick). Ohio State 7–3. Drive: 18 plays, 80 yards.

Second quarter

- USC – Chip Limahelu 42-yard field goal. Ohio State 7–6
- USC – J.K. McKay 10-yard pass from Anthony Davis (pass good), 5:16. USC 14–7.
- OSU – Pete Johnson 1-yard run (Blair Conway kick), 0:49. Tie 14–14. Drive: 12 plays.

Third quarter

- USC – Anthony Davis 1-yard run (Chip Limahelu kick), 6:30. USC 21–14. Drive: 14 plays, 84 yards.
- OSU – Pete Johnson 4-yard run (kick failed), 4:53. USC 21–20. Drive: 4 plays, 79 yards.
- OSU – Cornelius Greene 1-yard run (Blair Conway kick), 2:12. Ohio State 27–21.

Fourth quarter

- OSU – Bruce Elia 2-yard run (run good), 10:38. Ohio State 35–21.
- OSU – Archie Griffin 47-yard run (Blair Conway kick), 4:35. Ohio State 42–21.

Top passers

- USC – Pat Haden – 21/39, 229 yards
- OSU – Cornelius Greene – 6/8, 129 yards, INT

Top rushers

- USC – Anthony Davis – 16 rushes, 74 yards, TD
- OSU – Archie Griffin – 22 rushes, 149 yards, TD

Top receivers

- USC – J.K. McKay – 6 receptions, 83 yards, TD
- OSU – Fred Pagac – 4 receptions, 89 yards

MVP - Cornelius Greene 174 yards total offense, rush TD

== Roster ==
1973 Ohio State Buckeyes football team roster
Players
Coaches
Offense

Pos.	#	Name	Class
OL	59	Ronald Ayers
WR	87	Mike Bartoszek
WB	48	Brian Baschnagel
OL	58	Charles Baxter
RB	34	Dan Bembry
WB	13	Morris Bradshaw
OL	73	Scott Dannelley
OL	50	Michael Datish
FB, LB	36	Bruce Elia	Jr
WR	8	Bill Ezzo
OL	77	Doug France
RB	22	Richard Gales
OL	66	Larry Graf
QB	7	Cornelius Greene	So
RB	45	Archie Griffin	So
QB	18	Greg Hare (C)	Sr
WR	82	Dave Hazel
FB	38	Champ Henson
OT	74	John Hicks	Sr
RB	27	Tim Holycross
RB	44	John Hughes
OL	61	John Husband
FB	33	Pete Johnson	So
FB	4	Randal Keith
OL	55	Dwight King
OL	56	Stephen Koegel
G	63	Jim Kregel
OL	51	Gary Lillvis
RB	47	Elmer Lippert
OL	64	William Lukens
G	69	Dick Mack
RB	35	David Mazeroski
QB	14	Gary McCutcheon
RB	2	Larry Molls
WR	9	Robert Murphy
C	52	Steve Myers
QB	16	Jim Pacenta
TE	80	Fred Pagac
OL	68	Louis Petrini
TE	89	Ted Powell
QB	19	Dave Purdy
OL	65	Barney Renard
RB	41	Woody Roach
OT	72	Kurt Schumacher
OL	76	Dan Scott
TE	85	John Smurda
OL	57	Mark Straka
OL	60	Thomas Swank
QB	9	Kenneth Thompson
OL	70	Robert Willard

Defense

Pos.	#	Name	Class
DL	95	Richard Applegate
DL	92	Marvin Battle
LB	37	Brian Bowers
DL	84	Robert Brudzinski
DL	75	Nick Buonamici
DB	23	Craig Cassady
DL	78	Robert Coan
CB	20	Neal Colzie
DE	91	Jim Cope
LB	98	James Cramer
DL	90	Patrick Curto
DT	71	Pete Cusick
DT	67	Dan Cutillo
DB	16	Jeff Davis
DB	29	Jerome Davis
DE	88	Van DeCree
S	12	Tim Fox
DB	25	Robert Gentry
LB	53	Randy Gradishar
LB	42	Arnie Jones
DL	49	Larry Kain
DL	14	Robert Kelly
DB	21	Carl Kern
LB	62	Vic Koegel
LB	54	Ken Kuhn
DB	46	Steve Luke
DL	81	Thomas Marendt
DB	30	Lou Mathis
LB	32	Rick Middleton (C)
DB	11	Max Midlam
DL	79	Craig Nemitz
DL	99	Lawrence O'Rourke
DB	24	Rich Parsons
DB	28	Doug Plank
LB	35	Rocco Rich
DB	43	Bruce Ruhl
LB	97	Ted Smith
LB	39	Harold Thornton
DB	6	Monty Thompson
DL	93	Edward Trepanier
DL	83	Louis Willott

Special teams

Pos.	#	Name	Class
K	3	Blair Conway
P	5	Mike Keeton
K		Tom Klaban
P	1	Tom Skladany	Fr

Head coach

- Woody Hayes

Coordinators/assistant coaches

- George Chaump (Off)
- Charles Clausen (DT)
- Ed Ferkany (OG/P)
- George Hill (DC/LB)
- Rudy Hubbard (RB)
- John Mummey (ST)
- Esco Sarkkinen (DE)
- Ralph Staub (OT/TE/K)
- Dick Walker (DB)

Legend

- (C) Team captain
- (S) Suspended
- (I) Ineligible
- Injured
- Redshirt

Roster
Last update: 2015-Dec-05

== 1974 NFL draftees ==
Player	Round	Pick	Position	NFL club
John Hicks	1	3	Guard	New York Giants
Rick Middleton	1	13	Linebacker	New Orleans Saints
Randy Gradishar	1	14	Linebacker	Denver Broncos
Morris Bradshaw	4	93	Wide Receiver	Oakland Raiders
Gregg Hare	8	203	Quarterback	Buffalo Bills
Dan Scott	9	224	Guard	Cleveland Browns
Jim Kregel	10	243	Guard	Pittsburgh Steelers
Vic Koegel	12	304	Linebacker	Atlanta Falcons
