= 1973 Minnesota Golden Gophers football team =

American college football season

1973 Minnesota Golden Gophers football
- Conference: Big Ten Conference
- Record: 7–4 (6–2 Big Ten)
- Head coach: Cal Stoll (2nd season)
- MVPs: Steve Neils; Matt Herkenhoff
- Captain: Mike Steidl
- Home stadium: Memorial Stadium

1973 Big Ten Conference football standings
	Conf.					Overall
Team	W		L		T	W		L		T
No. 2 Ohio State +	7	–	0	–	1	10	–	0	–	1
No. 6 Michigan +	7	–	0	–	1	10	–	0	–	1
Minnesota	6	–	2	–	0	7	–	4	–	0
Illinois	4	–	4	–	0	5	–	6	–	0
Michigan State	4	–	4	–	0	5	–	6	–	0
Purdue	4	–	4	–	0	5	–	6	–	0
Northwestern	4	–	4	–	0	4	–	7	–	0
Wisconsin	3	–	5	–	0	4	–	7	–	0
Indiana	0	–	8	–	0	2	–	9	–	0
Iowa	0	–	8	–	0	0	–	11	–	0
+ – Conference co-champions; Rankings from AP Poll

The 1973 Minnesota Golden Gophers football team represented the University of Minnesota in the 1973 Big Ten Conference football season. In their second year under head coach Cal Stoll, the Golden Gophers compiled a 7–4 record but were outscored by their opponents by a combined total of 295 to 260.

End Steve Neils and offensive tackle Matt Herkenhoff shared the team's Most Valuable Player award. Neils and end Keith Fahnhorst were named All-Big Ten first team. Offensive guard Darrel Bunge and wide receiver Rick Upchurch were named All-Big Ten second team. Defensive lineman Jeff Gunderson was named Academic All-Big Ten.

Total attendance for the season was 245,706, which averaged to 40,951. The season high for attendance was against Nebraska.

== Schedule ==
Date	Opponent	Site	Result	Attendance	Source
September 15	at No. 3 Ohio State	Ohio Stadium; Columbus, OH	L 7–56	86,005	
September 22	North Dakota*	Memorial Stadium; Minneapolis, MN	W 41–14	35,477	
September 29	at Kansas*	Memorial Stadium; Lawrence, KS	L 19–34	44,500	
October 6	No. 2 Nebraska*	Memorial Stadium; Minneapolis, MN (rivalry)	L 7–48	58,091	
October 13	Indiana	Memorial Stadium; Minneapolis, MN	W 24–3	37,710	
October 20	at Iowa	Kinnick Stadium; Iowa City, IA (rivalry)	W 31–23	55,137	
October 27	No. 4 Michigan^{†}	Memorial Stadium; Minneapolis, MN (Little Brown Jug)	L 7–34	44,435	
November 3	at Northwestern	Dyche Stadium; Evanston, IL	W 52–43	30,081	
November 10	Purdue	Memorial Stadium; Minneapolis, MN	W 34–7	36,890	
November 17	at Illinois	Memorial Stadium; Champaign, IL	W 19–16	34,438	
November 24	Wisconsin	Memorial Stadium; Minneapolis, MN (rivalry)	W 19–17	34,412	
*Non-conference game; ^{†}Homecoming; Rankings from AP Poll released prior to the game

== Game summaries ==
=== At Ohio State ===
Minnesota Golden Gophers (0–0) at #3 Ohio State Buckeyes (0–0)

Quarter	1	2	3	4	Total
Minnesota	0	7	0	0	7
Ohio State	14	21	7	14	56

at Ohio Stadium, Columbus, Ohio

- Date: September 15
- Game weather: 74 °F (23 °C)
- Game attendance: 86,005

Game information

First quarter

- OSU – Champ Henson 2-yard run (Blair Conway kick), 10:24. Ohio State 7–0. Drive:
- OSU – Cornelius Greene 4-yard run (Blair Conway kick), 8:44. Ohio State 14–0. Drive:

Second quarter

- MINN – John King 1-yard run (Steve Goldberg kick), 12:59. Ohio State 14–7. Drive:
- OSU – Archie Griffin 93-yard kickoff return (Blair Conway kick), 12:45. Ohio State 21–7.
- OSU – Champ Henson 2-yard run (Blair Conway kick), 0:51. Ohio State 28–7. Drive:
- OSU – Brian Baschnagel 5-yard run (Blair Conway kick), 0:00. Ohio State 35–7. Drive:

Third quarter

- OSU – Neal Colzie 78-yard punt return (Blair Conway kick), 5:36. Ohio State 42–7.

Fourth quarter

- OSU – Champ Henson 1-yard run (Blair Conway kick), 10:39. Ohio State 49–7. Drive:
- OSU – Billy Ezzo 55-yard pass from Greg Hare (Blair Conway kick), 1:51. Ohio State 56–7. Drive:

Top passers

- MINN – John Lawing – 5/9, 31 yards, INT
- OSU – Greg Hare – 2/2, 64 yards, TD

Top rushers

- MINN – John King – 17 rushes, 51 yards, TD
- OSU – Archie Griffin – 15 rushes, 129 yards

Top receivers

- MINN – Keith Fahnhorst – 3 receptions, 23 yards
- OSU – Billy Ezzo – 1 reception, 55 yards, TD

=== At Iowa ===
Team	1	2	3	4	Total
• Minnesota	6	16	2	7	31
Iowa	14	3	6	0	23

- Date: October 20
- Location: Kinnick Stadium, Iowa City, Iowa
- Game attendance: 55,137

Scoring summary
1	IOWA	Jensen 3-yard run (Kokolus kick)	Iowa 7–0
1	MINN	Powell 46-yard run (kick failed)	Iowa 7–6
1	IOWA	Jensen 54-yard run (Kokolus kick)	Iowa 14–6
2	MINN	Lawing 1-yard run (Henrickson pass from Lawing)	Tie 14–14
2	IOWA	Kokolus 22-yard field goal	Iowa 17–14
2	MINN	Upchurch 3-yard run (Sims pass from Dungy)	Minnesota 22–17
3	IOWA	Fetter 10-yard pass from Ousley (pass failed)	Iowa 23–22
3	MINN	Safety	Minnesota 24–23
4	MINN	Dungy 10-yard run (Goldberg kick)	Minnesota 31–23

=== At Northwestern ===
Team	1	2	3	4	Total
• Minnesota	7	14	21	10	52
Northwestern	7	7	14	15	43

- Date: November 3
- Location: Dyche Stadium • Evanston, Illinois

Scoring summary
1	NW	Craig 18-yard pass from Anderson (Blazevich kick)	Northwestern 7-0
1	MINN	J. Jones 4-yard run (Goldberg kick)	Tie 7-7
2	NW	Craig 19-yard pass from Anderson (Blazevich kick)	Northwestern 14-7
2	MINN	Upchurch 5-yard run (Goldberg kick)	Tie 14-14
2	MINN	Upchurch 5-yard run (Goldberg kick)	Minnesota 21-14
3	NW	Stevens 21-yard pass from Anderson (Blazevich kick)	Tie 21-21
3	MINN	M. Jones 40-yard pass from Lawing (Goldberg kick)	Minnesota 28-21
3	MINN	M. Jones 48-yard pass from Lawing (Goldberg kick)	Minnesota 35-21
3	MINN	Lawing 5-yard run (Goldberg kick)	Minnesota 42-21
3	NW	Key 12-yard run (Blazevich kick)	Minnesota 42-28
4	MINN	Goldberg 35-yard field goal	Minnesota 45-28
4	NW	Harris 13-yard pass from Anderson (Blazevich kick)	Minnesota 45-35
4	MINN	M. Jones 48-yard pass from Lawing (Goldberg kick)	Minnesota 52-35
4	NW	Frederickson 20-yard pass from Anderson (Harris pass from Anderson)	Minnesota 52-43

=== Purdue ===
Team	1	2	3	4	Total
Purdue	0	0	7	0	7
• Minnesota	17	10	0	7	34

- Date: November 10
- Location: Memorial Stadium, Minneapolis
- Game attendance: 36,890

Scoring summary
1	MINN	John Lawing 1-yard run (Steve Goldberg kick)	MINN 7-0
1	MINN	Goldberg 32-yard field goal	MINN 10-0
1	MINN	Rick Upchurch 21-yard run (Steve Goldberg kick)	MINN 17-0
2	MINN	John Lawing 1-yard run (Steve Goldberg kick)	MINN 24-0
2	MINN	Steve Goldberg 43-yard field goal	MINN 27-0
3	PUR	Bobrowski 1-yard run (Conner kick)	MINN 27-7
4	MINN	Holmes 1-yard run (Steve Goldberg kick)	MINN 34-7

== Personnel ==
1973 Minnesota Golden Gophers football team roster
Players
Coaches
Offense

Pos.	#	Name	Class
OL		Darrel Bunge
OL		Dan Christensen
QB		Tony Dungy
TE		Keith Fahnhorst
QB		Gil Fash
WR		Vince Fuller
OL		Dale Hegland
WR		Dale Henricksen
OT	72	Matt Herkenhoff	Sr
RB		Buddy Holmes
RB		John Jones
WR		Mike Jones
RB		John King
QB		John Lawing
RB		Larry Powell
OL		Jeff Selleck
OL		Greg Shoff
OT	71	Dave Simonson	Sr
RB	40	Rick Upchurch	Jr

Defense

Pos.	#	Name	Class
LB		Ollie Bakken
DB	22	Doug Beaudoin	So
DB		Greg Engebos
DB		Orville Gilmore
LB		Paul Glanton
DL		Jeff Gunderson
DE	97	Steve Neils	Sr
DB		Todd Randall
DL		Keith Simons
LB		Mike Steldl

Special teams

Pos.	#	Name	Class
K		Steve Goldberg

Head coach

- Cal Stoll

Coordinators/assistant coaches

Legend

- (C) Team captain
- (S) Suspended
- (I) Ineligible
- Injured
- Redshirt

Roster
Last update: 2018-03-11
