= 1973 Michigan State Spartans football team =

American college football season

1973 Michigan State Spartans football
- Conference: Big Ten Conference
- Record: 5–6 (4–4 Big Ten)
- Head coach: Denny Stolz (1st season)
- Offensive coordinator: Andy MacDonald (1st season)
- MVP: Ray Nester
- Captains: Michael Holt; John Shinsky
- Home stadium: Spartan Stadium

1973 Big Ten Conference football standings
	Conf.					Overall
Team	W		L		T	W		L		T
No. 2 Ohio State +	7	–	0	–	1	10	–	0	–	1
No. 6 Michigan +	7	–	0	–	1	10	–	0	–	1
Minnesota	6	–	2	–	0	7	–	4	–	0
Illinois	4	–	4	–	0	5	–	6	–	0
Michigan State	4	–	4	–	0	5	–	6	–	0
Purdue	4	–	4	–	0	5	–	6	–	0
Northwestern	4	–	4	–	0	4	–	7	–	0
Wisconsin	3	–	5	–	0	4	–	7	–	0
Indiana	0	–	8	–	0	2	–	9	–	0
Iowa	0	–	8	–	0	0	–	11	–	0
+ – Conference co-champions; Rankings from AP Poll

The 1973 Michigan State Spartans football team was an American football team that represented Michigan State University as a member of the Big Ten Conference during the 1973 Big Ten football season. In their first season under head coach Denny Stolz, the Spartans compiled a 5–6 record (4–4 in conference games), tied for fourth place in the Big Ten, and were outscored by a total of 164 to 114. In four games against ranked opponents, they lost to No. 17 UCLA, No. 8 Notre Dame, No. 5 Michigan, and No. 1 Ohio State.

On offense, the Spartans gained an average of 172.0 rushing yards and 58.2 passing yards per game. On defense, they gave up 190.1 rushing yards and 55.7 passing yards per game. The individual statistical leaders included quarterback Charlie Baggett with 516 passing yards, halfback Clarence Bullock with 496 rushing yards, and split end Mike Hurd with 11 receptions and 163 receiving yards.

Defensive Bill Simpson was the only Spartan to be selected by either the Associated Press (AP) or the United Press International (UPI) as a first-team player on the 1973 All-Big Ten Conference football team. Simpson received first-team honors from the UPI and second-team honors from the AP. Other Spartans received second-team honors, including defensive tackle John Shinsky, linebackers Ray Nester and Terence McClowry, and defensive back Mark Niesen. Nester was selected as the team's most valuable player.

The team played its home games at Spartan Stadium in East Lansing, Michigan.

== Schedule ==
Date	Opponent	Site	Result	Attendance	Source
September 15	at Northwestern	Dyche Stadium; Evanston, IL	L 10–14	27,305	
September 22	at Syracuse*	Archbold Stadium; Syracuse, NY	W 14–8	21,821	
September 29	No. 17 UCLA*	Spartan Stadium; East Lansing, MI	L 21–34	60,850	
October 6	at No. 8 Notre Dame*	Notre Dame Stadium; Notre Dame, IN (rivalry)	L 10–14	59,075	
October 13	No. 5 Michigan	Spartan Stadium; East Lansing, MI (rivalry)	L 0–31	78,263	
October 20	Illinois	Spartan Stadium; East Lansing, MI	L 3–6	63,303	
October 27	at Purdue	Ross–Ade Stadium; West Lafayette, IN	W 10–7	55,291	
November 3	Wisconsin^{†}	Spartan Stadium; East Lansing, MI	W 21–0	54,010	
November 10	at No. 1 Ohio State	Ohio Stadium; Columbus, OH	L 0–35	87,600	
November 17	Indiana	Spartan Stadium; East Lansing, MI (rivalry)	W 10–9	50,116	
November 24	at Iowa	Kinnick Stadium; Iowa City, IA	W 15–6	31,119	
*Non-conference game; ^{†}Homecoming; Rankings from AP Poll released prior to the game

== Roster ==
1973 Michigan State Spartans football team roster
Players
Coaches
Offense

Pos.	#	Name	Class
QB		Charlie Baggett	So
TE		Mike Cobb	Fr
WR	21	Dane Fortney	So
RB		Mike Holt
QB		Tyrone Willingham

Defense

Pos.	#	Name	Class

Special teams

Pos.	#	Name	Class

Head coach

- Denny Stolz

Coordinators/assistant coaches

- Mike Rasmussen
  (Graduate assistant)

Legend

- (C) Team captain
- (S) Suspended
- (I) Ineligible
- Injured
- Redshirt

== Season summary ==
=== At Ohio State ===
Michigan State Spartans at Ohio State Buckeyes

Quarter	1	2	3	4	Total
Michigan St	0	0	0	0	0
Ohio St	7	14	7	7	35

at Ohio Stadium, Columbus, Ohio

- Date: November 10
- Game time: 1:30 p.m.
- Game weather: 36 °F (2 °C)
- Game attendance: 87,600
- Box Score

Game information

First quarter

- OSU – Bruce Elia 1-yard run (Blair Conway kick), 3:24. Ohio St 7–0. Drive:

Second quarter

- OSU – Bruce Elia 2-yard run (Blair Conway kick), 9:26. Ohio St 14–0. Drive:
- OSU – Neal Colzie 43-yard punt return (Blair Conway kick), 2:08. Ohio St 21–0.

Third quarter

- OSU – Bruce Elia 2-yard run (Blair Conway kick), 8:57. Ohio St 28–0. Drive:

Fourth quarter

- OSU – Pete Johnson 2-yard run (Blair Conway kick), 13:53. Ohio St 35–0. Drive:

Top passers

- MSU – Tyrone Willingham – 1/2, 6 yards
- OSU – Cornelius Greene – 3/6, 31 yards, INT

Top rushers

- MSU – Mike Holt – 13 rushes, 52 yards
- OSU – Archie Griffin – 21 rushes, 131 yards

Top receivers

- MSU – Mike Cobb – 1 reception, 6 yards
- OSU – Elmer Lippert – 1 reception, 20 yards
