= 1973 Wisconsin Badgers football team =

American college football season

1973 Wisconsin Badgers football
- Conference: Big Ten Conference
- Record: 4–7 (3–5 Big Ten)
- Head coach: John Jardine (4th season)
- Offensive coordinator: Ellis Rainsberger (1st season)
- Offensive scheme: I formation
- Defensive coordinator: Lew Stueck (4th season)
- Base defense: 5–2
- MVP: Mike Webster
- Captains: Chris Davis; Jim Schymanski; Mike Webster
- Home stadium: Camp Randall Stadium

1973 Big Ten Conference football standings
| | Conf. | | | | | Overall |
| Team | W | | L | | T | W | | L | | T |
|---|---|---|---|---|---|---|---|---|---|---|
| No. 2 Ohio State + | 7 | – | 0 | – | 1 | 10 | – | 0 | – | 1 |
| No. 6 Michigan + | 7 | – | 0 | – | 1 | 10 | – | 0 | – | 1 |
| Minnesota | 6 | – | 2 | – | 0 | 7 | – | 4 | – | 0 |
| Illinois | 4 | – | 4 | – | 0 | 5 | – | 6 | – | 0 |
| Michigan State | 4 | – | 4 | – | 0 | 5 | – | 6 | – | 0 |
| Purdue | 4 | – | 4 | – | 0 | 5 | – | 6 | – | 0 |
| Northwestern | 4 | – | 4 | – | 0 | 4 | – | 7 | – | 0 |
| Wisconsin | 3 | – | 5 | – | 0 | 4 | – | 7 | – | 0 |
| Indiana | 0 | – | 8 | – | 0 | 2 | – | 9 | – | 0 |
| Iowa | 0 | – | 8 | – | 0 | 0 | – | 11 | – | 0 |
+ – Conference co-champions; Rankings from AP Poll

The 1973 Wisconsin Badgers football team was an American football team that represented the University of Wisconsin as a member of the Big Ten Conference during the 1973 Big Ten season. In their fourth year under head coach John Jardine, the Badgers compiled a 4–7 record (3–5 in conference games), finished in eighth place in the Big Ten, and were outscored by a total of 237 to 216.

The Badgers gained an average of 111.2 passing yards and 238.7 rushing yards per game. On defense, they gave up an average of 114.3 passing yards and 244.3 rushing yards per game. The team's individual statistical leaders included: quarterback Gregg Bohlig (1,211 passing yards); running back Billy Marek (1,207 rushing yards); and tight end Jack Novak (13 receptions for 282 yards).

Chris Davis, Jim Schymanski, and Mike Webster were the team captains. Webster was selected as the team's most valuable player. Five Wisconsin players received first- or second-team All-Big Ten honors from the Associated Press (AP) or United Press International (UPI): Webster (AP-1, UPI-1); Marek at running back (AP-1, UPI-2); Dennis Lick at offensive tackle (AP-2, UPI-2); Jim Schymanski at defensive line (AP-2); and Jeff Mack at end/receiver (UPI-2).

The Badgers played their home games at Camp Randall Stadium in Madison, Wisconsin.

== Schedule ==
| Date | Opponent | Site | Result | Attendance | Source |
|---|---|---|---|---|---|
| September 15 | Purdue | Camp Randall Stadium; Madison, WI | L 13–14 | 58,265 | |
| September 22 | No. 19 Colorado* | Camp Randall Stadium; Madison, WI | L 25–28 | 58,237 | |
| September 29 | at No. 2 Nebraska* | Memorial Stadium; Lincoln, NE (rivalry) | L 16–20 | 76,279 | |
| October 6 | Wyoming* | Camp Randal Stadium; Madison, WI | W 37–28 | 60,715 | |
| October 13 | No. 1 Ohio State | Camp Randall Stadium; Madison, WI | L 0–24 | 77,413 | |
| October 20 | at No. 4 Michigan | Michigan Stadium; Ann Arbor, MI | L 6–35 | 87,273 | |
| October 27 | Indiana^{†} | Camp Randall Stadium; Madison, WI | W 31–7 | 66,365 | |
| November 4 | at Michigan State | Spartan Stadium; East Lansing, MI | L 0–21 | 54,010 | |
| November 10 | Iowa | Camp Randall Stadium; Madison, WI (rivalry) | W 35–7 | 55,560 | |
| November 17 | Northwestern | Camp Randall Stadium; Madison, WI | W 36–34 | 46,248 | |
| November 24 | at Minnesota | Memorial Stadium; Minneapolis, MN (rivalry) | L 17–19 | 34,412 | |
*Non-conference game; ^{†}Homecoming; Rankings from AP Poll released prior to the game

== Game summaries ==
=== Ohio State ===
#1 Ohio State Buckeyes (3–0) at Wisconsin Badgers (1–3)

| Quarter | 1 | 2 | 3 | 4 | Total |
|---|---|---|---|---|---|
| Ohio State | 7 | 0 | 7 | 10 | 24 |
| Wisconsin | 0 | 0 | 0 | 0 | 0 |

at Camp Randall Stadium, Madison, Wisconsin

- Date: October 13
- Game time: 1:00 p.m.
- Game weather: Sunny, 68 °F (20 °C)
- Game attendance: 77,413
- Referee: Glenn Fortin

Game information

First quarter

- OSU – Bruce Elia 1-yard run (Blair Conway kick), 0:18. Ohio State 7–0. Drive:

Second quarter

- No scoring

Third quarter

- OSU – Cornelius Greene 2-yard run (Blair Conway kick), 11:29. Ohio State 14–0. Drive:

Fourth quarter

- OSU – Blair Conway 36-yard field goal, 11:12. Ohio State 17–0. Drive:
- OSU – Bruce Elia 1-yard run (Blair Conway kick), 5:09. Ohio State 24–0. Drive:

Top passers

- OSU – Cornelius Greene – 1/6, 22 yard, INT
- WIS – Gregg Bohlig – 9/18, 98 yards, INT

Top rushers

- OSU – Archie Griffin – 29 rushes, 169 yards, TD
- WIS – Billy Marek – 13 rushes, 49 yards

Top receivers

- OSU – Fred Pagac – 1 reception, 22 yards
- WIS – Art Sanger – 2 receptions, 35 yards

== Roster ==
1973 Wisconsin Badgers football team roster
Players
Coaches
Offense

| Pos. | # | Name | Class |
|---|---|---|---|
| OT | 76 | Greg Apkarian | Sr |
| FB | 33 | Jim Bachuber | Sr |
| G | 66 | Mike Becker (injured) | Sr |
| QB | 14 | Gregg Bohlig | Jr |
| G | 63 | Bob Braun | Sr |
| FB | 30 | Larry Canada | Fr |
| QB | 17 | Larry Clawson | Sr |
| OT | 72 | Chuck Deerwester | Sr |
| WR | 18 | Mike Harrington | Sr |
| OT | 75 | Bob Johnson | Jr |
| RB | 22 | Duane Johnson | So |
| G | 64 | Rick Koeck | Jr |
| QB | 9 | Dan Kopina | So |
| OT | 70 | Dennis Lick | So |
| WR | 39 | Jeff Mack | Jr |
| G | 61 | Dennis Manic | Sr |
| RB | 26 | Billy Marek | So |
| TE | 88 | Jack Novak | Jr |
| RB | 27 | Ron Pollard | Fr |
| WR | 87 | Rod Rhodes | Jr |
| WR | 42 | Greg Salen | Sr |
| WR | 45 | Art Sanger | Jr |
| WR | 42 | Greg Salen | Sr |
| G | 67 | Dan Schroeder | Sr |
| FB | 32 | Ken Starch | So |
| TE | 91 | Jon Stewart | Sr |
| G | 68 | Terry Stieve | So |
| RB | 29 | Selvie Washington | Jr |
| C | 51 | Mike Webster (C) | Sr |
| TE, P | 41 | Stan Williams | Jr |

Defense

| Pos. | # | Name | Class |
|---|---|---|---|
| LB | 92 | Mike Benninger | Jr |
| DE | 58 | Ed Bosold | Sr |
| S | 10 | Terry Buss | So |
| CB | 28 | Pat Collins | Fr |
| S | 11 | Mark Cullen | Jr |
| DE | 93 | Carl Davis | Fr |
| S | 19 | Chris Davis (C) | Sr |
| DT | 90 | Gary Dickert | Jr |
| LB | 49 | Jim Franz | So |
| DT | 99 | Kevin Froelich | Sr |
| LB | 35 | Bob Hanssen | Sr |
| MG | 54 | Brian Harney | Sr |
| LB | 34 | Rick Jakious | Jr |
| MG | 36 | Mike Jenkins | Jr |
| DT | 57 | Tom Jones | Fr |
| DE | 38 | Mike Levenhagen | Sr |
| CB | 12 | Greg Lewis | So |
| CB | 24 | Alvin Peabody | Jr |
| DT | 76 | John Rasmussen | Fr |
| DT | 97 | Steve Riese | Sr |
| DT | 74 | Jim Schymanski (C) | Sr |
| DT | 81 | Mike Seifert | Sr |
| CB, P | 8 | Ken Simmons | So |
| DB | 20 | John Smith | Sr |
| DE | 65 | Mike Vesperman | Jr |
| S | 6 | Steve Wagner | So |
| DE | 47 | Mark Zakula | Jr |
| LB | 50 | John Zimmerman | So |

Special teams

| Pos. | # | Name | Class |
|---|---|---|---|
| K | 7 | Rich Barrios | Sr |
| K | 2 | Vince Lamia | Fr |
| CB, P | 8 | Ken Simmons | So |
| TE, P | 41 | Stan Williams | Jr |

Head coach

- John Jardine

Coordinators/assistant coaches

- Ellis Rainsberger – Offensive Coordinator
- Lew Stueck – Defensive Coordinator/Linebackers
- George Chryst – Offensive Line
- Jim Martin – Wide Receivers
- Charlie McBride – Offensive Line
- Dick Selcer – Defensive Backs
- Bob Spoo – Quarterbacks
- Dick Teteak – Defensive Line
- LaVern Van Dyke – Administrative Assistant

Legend

- (C) Team captain
- (S) Suspended
- (I) Ineligible
- Injured
- Redshirt

== 1974 NFL draft ==
| Player | Position | Round | Pick | NFL club |
|---|---|---|---|---|
| Mike Webster | Center | 5 | 125 | Pittsburgh Steelers |
| Mike Seifert | Defensive End | 13 | 327 | Cleveland Browns |
