= 1973 Iowa Hawkeyes football team =

American college football season

1973 Iowa Hawkeyes football
- Conference: Big Ten Conference
- Record: 0–11 (0–8 Big Ten)
- Head coach: Frank Lauterbur (3rd season)
- Offensive coordinator: Howard Vernon (1st season)
- MVP: Brian Rollins
- Captains: Dan Dickel; Brian Rollins; Roger Jerrick
- Home stadium: Kinnick Stadium

1973 Big Ten Conference football standings
	Conf.					Overall
Team	W		L		T	W		L		T
No. 2 Ohio State +	7	–	0	–	1	10	–	0	–	1
No. 6 Michigan +	7	–	0	–	1	10	–	0	–	1
Minnesota	6	–	2	–	0	7	–	4	–	0
Illinois	4	–	4	–	0	5	–	6	–	0
Michigan State	4	–	4	–	0	5	–	6	–	0
Purdue	4	–	4	–	0	5	–	6	–	0
Northwestern	4	–	4	–	0	4	–	7	–	0
Wisconsin	3	–	5	–	0	4	–	7	–	0
Indiana	0	–	8	–	0	2	–	9	–	0
Iowa	0	–	8	–	0	0	–	11	–	0
+ – Conference co-champions; Rankings from AP Poll

The 1973 Iowa Hawkeyes football team was an American football team that represented the University of Iowa as a member of the Big Ten Conference during the 1973 Big Ten football season. In their third and final year under head coach Frank Lauterbur, the Hawkeyes compiled a 0–11 record (0–8 in conference game), finished in last place in the Big Ten, and were outscored by a total of 401 to 140.

The 1973 Hawkeyes gained 1,599 rushing yards and 1,126 passing yards. On defense, they gave up 3,848 rushing yards and 716 passing yards. The team had both worst rush defense and the best pass defense in program history. They gave up 349.8 rushing yards per game, while holding opponents to average of only 65.1 passing yards per game.

The team's statistical leaders included Butch Caldwell (36-of-99 passing for 549 yards), Jim Jenson (509 rushing yards, 44 points scored), Brian Rollins (33 receptions for 408 yards), and Dan LeFleur (127 total tackles). Jim Caldwell set an Iowa single-season record (still standing) with five blocked kicks. Rollins, center Roger Jerrick, and defensive end Dan Dickel were the team captains. Rollins was also selected as the team's most valuable player.

Despite the team's winless record, the 1973 Hawkeyes included players that experienced significant success in their football careers. Rod Walters was a first round draft pick, Joe Devlin was a second round pick and started 179 games in the NFL, and Jim Caldwell was an assistant coach on two Super Bowl champions and reached the Super Bowl as a head coach.

The team played its home games at Kinnick Stadium in Iowa City, Iowa. Home attendance totaled 217,846, an average of 43,569 per game. It was Iowa's lowest per-game attendance since 1951.

== Schedule ==
Date	Opponent	Site	Result	Attendance	Source
September 15	No. 5 Michigan	Kinnick Stadium; Iowa City, IA	L 7–31	52,105	
September 22	at No. 18 UCLA*	Los Angeles Memorial Coliseum; Los Angeles, CA	L 18–55	34,546	
September 29	at No. 6 Penn State*	Beaver Stadium; University Park, PA	L 8–27	59,980	
October 6	Arizona*	Kinnick Stadium; Iowa City, IA	L 20–23	40,365	
October 13	at Northwestern	Dyche Stadium; Evanston, IL	L 15–31	25,194	
October 20	Minnesota^{†}	Kinnick Stadium; Iowa City, IA (rivalry)	L 23–31	55,137	
October 27	at Illinois	Memorial Stadium; Champaign, IL	L 0–50	46,864	
November 3	Purdue	Kinnick Stadium; Iowa City, IA	L 23–48	39,120	
November 10	at Wisconsin	Camp Randall Stadium; Madison, WI	L 7–35	55,560	
November 17	at No. 1 Ohio State	Ohio Stadium; Columbus, OH	L 13–55	87,447	
November 24	Michigan State	Kinnick Stadium; Iowa City, IA	L 6–15	31,119	
*Non-conference game; ^{†}Homecoming; Rankings from AP Poll released prior to the game

== Game summaries ==
=== No. 5 Michigan ===
No. 5 Michigan at Iowa

Team	1	2	3	4	Total
• No. 5 Wolverines	10	7	7	7	31
Hawkeyes	0	7	0	0	7

- Date: September 15, 1973
- Location:
  Kinnick Stadium
  Iowa City, IA
- Game attendance: 52,105
- Game weather: 69 °F (21 °C), Cloudy, Wind W 5 mph (8.0 km/h)
- Source: Box Score

Scoring summary
1	12:50	Mich	Lantry 39-yard field goal	Mich 3–0
1	6:53	Mich	Heater 1-yard run (Lantry kick)	Mich 10–0
2	9:28	Iowa	Earl Douthitt 47-yard interception return (Kokolus kick)	Mich 10–7
2	3:51	Mich	Thornbladh 3-yard run (Lantry kick)	Mich 17–7
3	9:33	Mich	Chapman 12-yard run (Lantry kick)	Mich 24–7
4	7:38	Mich	Franklin 11-yard run (Lantry kick)	Mich 31–7

=== at No. 18 UCLA ===
Iowa at No. 18 UCLA

Team	1	2	3	4	Total
Hawkeyes	10	0	0	8	18
• No. 18 Bruins	3	21	10	21	55

- Date: September 22, 1973
- Location:
  Los Angeles Memorial Coliseum
  Los Angeles, CA
- Game attendance: 34,456
- Source: Box Score

Scoring summary
1	UCLA	Herrera 24-yard field goal	UCLA 3–0
1	Iowa	Kokolus 45-yard field goal	Tied 3–3
1	Iowa	Rollins 11-yard pass from Skogman (Kokolus kick)	Iowa 10–3
2	UCLA	James McAlister 1-yard run (Herrera kick)	Tied 10–10
2	UCLA	Harmon 1-yard run (Herrera kick)	UCLA 17–10
2	UCLA	John Sciarra 2-yard run (Herrera kick)	UCLA 24–10
3	UCLA	Johnson 9-yard run (Herrera kick)	UCLA 31–10
3	UCLA	Herrera 44-yard field goal	UCLA 34–10
4	UCLA	Tyler 4-yard run (Lantry kick)	UCLA 41–10
4	Iowa	Skogman 5-yard run (Jenson pass from Skogman)	UCLA 41–18
4	UCLA	Raymond Burks 46-yard pass from John Sciarra (Herrera kick)	UCLA 48–18
4	UCLA	John Sciarra 7-yard run (Herrera kick)	UCLA 55–18

=== at No. 6 Penn State ===
Iowa at No. 6 Penn State

Team	1	2	3	4	Total
Hawkeyes	0	0	0	8	8
• No. 6 Nittany Lions	21	0	6	0	27

- Date: September 29, 1973
- Location:
  Beaver Stadium
  University Park, PA
- Game attendance: 59,980
- Source: Box Score

Scoring summary
1	11:36	PSU	Cappelletti 16-yard run (Bahr kick)	Penn State 7–0
1	5:20	PSU	Herd 9-yard pass from Shuman (Bahr kick)	Penn State 14–0
1	3:08	PSU	Bland 32-yard pass from Shuman (Bahr kick)	Penn State 21–0
3		PSU	Herd 12-yard pass from Shuman (Bahr kick failed)	Penn State 27–0
4		Iowa	Jensen 7-yard pass from Caldwell (Caldwell run)	Penn State 27–8

=== Arizona ===
Arizona at Iowa

Team	1	2	3	4	Total
• Wildcats	7	3	10	3	23
Hawkeyes	7	3	3	7	20

- Date: October 6, 1973
- Location:
  Kinnick Stadium
  Iowa City, IA
- Game attendance: 40,365
- Game weather: 69 °F (21 °C), Cloudy, Wind S 10 mph (16 km/h)
- Source: Box Score

Scoring summary
1		Iowa	Jensen 1-yard run (Kokolus kick)	Iowa 7–0
1		Ariz	Hamilton 20-yard run (Gorham kick)	Tied 7–7
2		Iowa	Gorham 33-yard field goal	Ariz 10–7
2		Iowa	Kokolus 41-yard field goal	Tied 10–10
3	10:32	Ariz	Upchurch 7-yard run (Gorham kick)	Ariz 17–10
3	6:44	Iowa	Kokolus 20-yard field goal	Ariz 17–13
3	0:34	Ariz	Gorham 28-yard field goal	Ariz 20–13
4	12:54	Iowa	Butch Caldwell 39-yard run (Kokolus kick)	Tied 20–20
4	2:09	Ariz	Gorham 23-yard field goal	Ariz 23–20

=== at Northwestern ===
Iowa at Northwestern

Team	1	2	3	4	Total
Hawkeyes	0	6	7	2	15
• Wildcats	14	10	7	0	31

- Date: October 13, 1973
- Location:
  Dyche Stadium
  Evanston, IL
- Game attendance: 25,194
- Source: Box Score

Scoring summary
1	9:19	NW	Jim Trimble 1-yard run (Blazevich kick)	NW 7–0
1	7:51	NW	Boykin 12-yard run (Blazevich kick)	NW 14–0
2	14:57	NW	Blazevich 21-yard field goal	NW 17–0
2	10:16	NW	Key 3-yard run (Blazevich kick)	NW 24–0
2	5:41	Iowa	Jensen 1-yard run (pass failed)	NW 24–6
3	8:56	Iowa	Schultz 35-yard pass from Skogman (Kokolus kick)	NW 24–13
3	0:28	NW	McNamara 29-yard pass from Anderson (Blazevich kick)	NW 31–13
4	7:26	Iowa	Safety, punt snap out of end zone	NW 31–15

=== Minnesota ===
Minnesota at Iowa

Team	1	2	3	4	Total
• Golden Gophers	6	16	2	7	31
Hawkeyes	14	3	6	0	23

- Date: October 20, 1973
- Location:
  Kinnick Stadium
  Iowa City, IA
- Game attendance: 55,137
- Game weather: 71 °F (22 °C), Clear, Wind SE 5–7 mph (8.0–11.3 km/h)
- Source: Box Score

=== at Illinois ===
Iowa at Illinois

Team	1	2	3	4	Total
Hawkeyes	0	0	0	0	0
• Fighting Illini	6	13	3	28	50

- Date: October 27, 1973
- Location:
  Memorial Stadium
  Champaign, IL
- Game attendance: 48,864
- Game weather: Light rain, 54 °F (12 °C)
- Source: Box Score

=== Purdue ===
Purdue at Iowa

Team	1	2	3	4	Total
• Boilermakers	14	14	14	6	48
Hawkeyes	7	0	0	16	23

- Date: November 3, 1973
- Location:
  Kinnick Stadium
  Iowa City, IA
- Game attendance: 39,120
- Game weather: 47 °F (8 °C), Cloudy, Wind N 10 mph (16 km/h)
- Source: Box Score

Purdue freshman Mike Northington ran for 146 yards and tied a Big Ten-record with five touchdowns on 31 carries. Also of note, the Boilermakers scored their final touchdown with just 39 seconds remaining, attempting a failed two-point conversion after the score.

=== at Wisconsin ===
Iowa at Wisconsin

Team	1	2	3	4	Total
Hawkeyes	0	0	7	0	7
• Badgers	21	7	0	7	35

- Date: November 10, 1973
- Location:
  Camp Randall Stadium
  Madison, WI
- Game attendance: 55,560
- Game weather: Clear, 35 °F (2 °C)
- Referee: Otho Kortz
- Source: Box Score

Scoring summary
1	13:45	Wisc	Marek 45-yard run (Lamia kick)	Wisconsin 7–0
1	10:20	Wisc	Marek 5-yard run (kick blocked)	Wisconsin 13–0
1	0:18	Wisc	Marek 32-yard run (Bohlig run)	Wisconsin 21–0
2	2:09	Wisc	Rhodes 31-yard pass from Bohlig (Lamia kick)	Wisconsin 28–0
3	9:47	Iowa	Fetter 6-yard run (Kokolus kick)	Wisconsin 28–7
4	5:20	Wisc	Marek 1-yard run (Lamia kick)	Wisconsin 35–7

Wisconsin sophomore Billy Marek ran for 203 yards and 4 touchdowns.

=== at No. 1 Ohio State ===
Iowa at No. 1 Ohio State

Team	1	2	3	4	Total
Hawkeyes	0	0	0	13	13
• No. 1 Buckeyes	14	13	21	7	55

- Date: November 17, 1973
- Location:
  Ohio Stadium
  Columbus, OH
- Game attendance: 87,447
- Game weather: Clear, 42 °F (6 °C)
- Source: Box Score

Scoring summary
1	10:21	OSU	Bruce Elia 1-yard run (Blair Conway kick)	Ohio State 7–0
1	4:30	OSU	Elia 1-yard run (Conway kick)	Ohio State 14–0
2	2:27	OSU	Cornelius Greene 1-yard run (kick failed)	Ohio State 20–0
2	0:07	OSU	Dave Hazel 41-yard run pass from Cornelius Greene (Conway kick)	Ohio State 27–0
3	7:38	OSU	Elia 3-yard run (Conway kick)	Ohio State 34–0
3	2:49	OSU	Archie Griffin 8-yard run (Conway kick)	Ohio State 41–0
3	0:34	OSU	Elia 3-yard run (Conway kick)	Ohio State 48–0
4	14:48	Iowa	Bill Schultz 78-yard pass from Butch Caldwell (Kokolus kick)	Ohio State 48–7
4	8:22	Iowa	Rod Wellington 2-yard run (pass failed)	Ohio State 48–13
4	6:44	OSU	Elmer Lippert 12-yard run (Tom Klaban kick)	Ohio State 55–13

Ohio State sophomore Archie Griffin ran for 246 yards on 30 carries, establishing single-game and single-season school records for rushing yardage. Junior fullback Bruce Elia had 4 rushing touchdowns for the Buckeyes.

=== Michigan State ===
Michigan State at Iowa

Team	1	2	3	4	Total
• Spartans	0	2	10	3	15
Hawkeyes	0	0	0	6	6

- Date: November 24, 1973
- Location:
  Kinnick Stadium
  Iowa City, IA
- Game attendance: 31,119
- Game weather: 48 °F (9 °C), Cloudy, Wind NW 6–12 mph (9.7–19.3 km/h)
- Source: Box Score

== Roster ==
1973 Iowa Hawkeyes football team roster
Players
Coaches
Offense

Pos.	#	Name	Class
QB	17	Butch Caldwell	So
QB	11	Kyle Skogman	Sr
RB	22	Jim Jensen	So
OL	72	Joe Devlin	So
C		Roger Jerrick	Sr
OL	60	Dan McCarney	Jr
OL	76	Rod Walters	So
WR	85	Brian Rollins	Sr
WR		Bill Schultz
RB	41	Rod Wellington	So

Defense

Pos.	#	Name	Class
LB	20	Andre Jackson	So
LB	55	Dan LaFleur
DB	21	Jim Caldwell	Fr
DB	46	Earl Douthitt	Jr
DB	29	Rick Penney	So
DE	88	Dan Dickel	Sr

Special teams

Pos.	#	Name	Class
P		Joe Heppner
K	3	Harry Kokolus

Head coach

- Frank Lauterbur

Coordinators/assistant coaches

- Howard Vernon
- Jack Harbaugh

Legend

- (C) Team captain
- (S) Suspended
- (I) Ineligible
- Injured
- Redshirt

== Team players in the 1974 NFL draft ==
Player	Position	Round	Pick	NFL club
Dan Dickel	Linebacker	7	170	Baltimore Colts
