= 1973 Northwestern Wildcats football team =

American college football season

1973 Northwestern Wildcats football
- Conference: Big Ten Conference
- Record: 4–7 (4–4 Big Ten)
- Head coach: John Pont (1st season)
- Captain: Stan Key
- Home stadium: Dyche Stadium

1973 Big Ten Conference football standings
	Conf.					Overall
Team	W		L		T	W		L		T
No. 2 Ohio State +	7	–	0	–	1	10	–	0	–	1
No. 6 Michigan +	7	–	0	–	1	10	–	0	–	1
Minnesota	6	–	2	–	0	7	–	4	–	0
Illinois	4	–	4	–	0	5	–	6	–	0
Michigan State	4	–	4	–	0	5	–	6	–	0
Purdue	4	–	4	–	0	5	–	6	–	0
Northwestern	4	–	4	–	0	4	–	7	–	0
Wisconsin	3	–	5	–	0	4	–	7	–	0
Indiana	0	–	8	–	0	2	–	9	–	0
Iowa	0	–	8	–	0	0	–	11	–	0
+ – Conference co-champions; Rankings from AP Poll

The 1973 Northwestern Wildcats team represented Northwestern University in the 1973 Big Ten Conference football season. In their first year under head coach John Pont, the Wildcats compiled a 4–7 record (4–4 against Big Ten Conference opponents) and finished in a four-way tie for fourth place in the Big Ten Conference.

The team's offensive leaders were quarterback Mitch Anderson with 1,224 passing yards, Stan Key with 894 rushing yards, and Steve Craig with 479 receiving yards. Four Northwestern players received All-Big Ten honors. They are: (1) tight end Steve Craig (AP-1, UPI-1); (2) linebacker Mike Varty (AP-1, UPI-2); (3) quarterback Mitch Anderson (AP-2, UPI-2); and (4) running back Stan Key (AP-2).

== Schedule ==
Date	Time	Opponent	Site	Result	Attendance	Source
September 15		Michigan State	Dyche Stadium; Evanston, IL	W 14–10	27,305	
September 22		at No. 8 Notre Dame*	Notre Dame Stadium; Notre Dame, IN (rivalry)	L 0–44	59,075	
September 29		Pittsburgh*	Dyche Stadium; Evanston, IL	L 14–21	24,462	
October 6	1:30 p.m.	Ohio*	Dyche Stadium; Evanston, IL	L 12–14	21,056	
October 13		Iowa	Dyche Stadium; Evanston, IL	W 31–15	25,194	
October 20		at Purdue	Ross–Ade Stadium; West Lafayette, IN	L 10–21	57,657	
October 27		at No. 1 Ohio State	Ohio Stadium; Columbus, OH	L 0–60	87,453	
November 3		Minnesota	Dyche Stadium; Evanston, IL	L 43–52	30,081	
November 10		at Indiana	Memorial Stadium; Bloomington, IN	W 21–20	41,053	
November 17		at Wisconsin	Camp Randall Stadium; Madison, WI	L 34–36	46,248	
November 24		Illinois	Dyche Stadium; Evanston, IL (rivalry)	W 9–6	26,117	
*Non-conference game; Rankings from AP Poll released prior to the game

== Personnel ==
1973 Northwestern Wildcats football team roster
Players
Coaches
Offense

Pos.	#	Name	Class
QB	12	Mitch Anderson	Jr
RB	44	Rich Boothe	So
RB	20	Greg Boykin	So
TE	84	Steve Craig	Sr
OT	72	Paul Curtis	Sr
WR	5	Mike Darraugh	So
G	61	Ray Felton	Sr
WR, P	25	Wayne Frederickson	So
QB	16	Kim Girkins	So
WR	28	Steve Harris	Sr
G	64	Donnie Haynes	Sr
OT	68	Paul Hiemenz	Jr
RB	21	Stan Key (C)	Sr
C	57	Larry Lilja	Jr
TE	80	Frank Lutostanski	Sr
WR	19	Pat McNamara	So
RB	24	Jim Pooler	So
WR	46	Bill Stevens	Jr
RB	39	Jim Trimble	Jr
TE		Scott Yelvington

Defense

Pos.	#	Name	Class
LB	38	Steve Anenen	Sr
DL	43	Doug Belko	So
DL	76	Darryl Branford	Jr
DB	42	Craig Countryman	Fr
DB	47	Rich Dart	Fr
DT	60	James Foskett	So
DB	40	Charles Hickerson	Jr
DL	93	John Holliday	So
DB	17	Mark Krumtinger	Sr
DB	29	Neil Little	Fr
DL	52	Paul Maly	Fr
DL	98	Rob Mason	Jr
DT	77	Dale Mize	Sr
DB	22	Ken Shaw	So
DL	54	Jamie Summerfelt	Sr
DB	15	Greg Swanson	Sr
LB	66	Mike Varty	Sr
DB	26	Pete Wessel	Sr

Special teams

Pos.	#	Name	Class

Head coach

- John Pont

Coordinators/assistant coaches

Legend

- (C) Team captain
- (S) Suspended
- (I) Ineligible
- Injured
- Redshirt
