= Lauterbur =

Lauterbur is a surname. Notable people with the surname include:

- Frank Lauterbur (1925–2013), American football player and coach
- Paul Lauterbur (1929–2007), American chemist
