= 1973 Indiana Hoosiers football team =

American college football season

1973 Indiana Hoosiers football
- Conference: Big Ten Conference
- Record: 2–9 (0–8 Big Ten)
- Head coach: Lee Corso (1st season)
- MVP: Chuck Sukurs
- Captain: Ken Starling
- Home stadium: Memorial Stadium

1973 Big Ten Conference football standings
	Conf.					Overall
Team	W		L		T	W		L		T
No. 2 Ohio State +	7	–	0	–	1	10	–	0	–	1
No. 6 Michigan +	7	–	0	–	1	10	–	0	–	1
Minnesota	6	–	2	–	0	7	–	4	–	0
Illinois	4	–	4	–	0	5	–	6	–	0
Michigan State	4	–	4	–	0	5	–	6	–	0
Purdue	4	–	4	–	0	5	–	6	–	0
Northwestern	4	–	4	–	0	4	–	7	–	0
Wisconsin	3	–	5	–	0	4	–	7	–	0
Indiana	0	–	8	–	0	2	–	9	–	0
Iowa	0	–	8	–	0	0	–	11	–	0
+ – Conference co-champions; Rankings from AP Poll

The 1973 Indiana Hoosiers football team represented the Indiana Hoosiers in the 1973 Big Ten Conference football season. The Hoosiers played their home games at Memorial Stadium in Bloomington, Indiana. The team was coached by Lee Corso, in his first year as head coach of the Hoosiers.

== Schedule ==
Date	Opponent	Site	Result	Attendance	Source
September 15	Illinois	Memorial Stadium; Bloomington, IN (rivalry)	L 14–28	51,433	
September 22	at Arizona*	Arizona Stadium; Tucson, AZ	L 10–26	38,643	
September 29	Kentucky*	Memorial Stadium; Bloomington, IN (rivalry)	W 17–3	51,523	
October 6	at No. 20 West Virginia*	Mountaineer Field; Morgantown, WV	W 28–14	37,000	
October 13	at Minnesota	Memorial Stadium; Minneapolis, MN	L 3–24	37,710	
October 20	No. 1 Ohio State^{†}	Memorial Stadium; Bloomington, IN	L 7–37	53,183	
October 27	at Wisconsin	Camp Randall Stadium; Madison, WI	L 7–31	66,365	
November 3	at No. 4 Michigan	Michigan Stadium; Ann Arbor, MI	L 13–49	76,432	
November 10	Northwestern	Memorial Stadium; Bloomington, IN	L 20–21	41,053	
November 17	at Michigan State	Spartan Stadium; East Lansing, MI (rivalry)	L 9–10	50,116	
November 24	Purdue	Memorial Stadium; Bloomington, IN (Old Oaken Bucket)	L 23–28	44,789	
*Non-conference game; ^{†}Homecoming; Rankings from AP Poll released prior to the game

== Personnel ==
1973 Indiana Hoosiers football team roster
Players
Coaches
Offense

Pos.	#	Name	Class
WR		Bill Armstrong
OL		John Babcock
OL		Carl Barzilaukas
OL		Dan Boarman
RB		Dennis Cremeens
WR		Mike Flanagan
QB		Mike Glazier
WR		Rodney Harris
WR		Neil Hayes
RB		Reggie Holmes
QB		Willie Jones
RB		Joel Kirby
QB		Bob Kramer
TE		Steve Mastin
OL		Chuck Shukurs
OL		Dean Shumaker
TE		Trent Smock
RB		Courtney Snyder
OL		Bill Sparhawk
RB		Ken St. Pierre
RB		Ken Starling (C)
RB		Harold Waterhouse
WR		Bill Weeks
RB		Sylvester Wilson
RB		Mark Zellmer

Defense

Pos.	#	Name	Class
DB		Bill Atkinson
DB		Marc Bailey
LB		Tom Buck
DB		Quinn Buckner
LB		Mark Deming
DL		Mark DiSalvo
DB		Kirk Edwards
DL		John Jordan
DB		Rod Lawson
DL		Stu O'Dell
DB		Gary Powell
LB		Steve Sanders
LB		Donnie Thomas
DL		Mike Winslow

Special teams

Pos.	#	Name	Class
K		Frank Stavroff
P		Jim Wenzel

Head coach

- Lee Corso

Coordinators/assistant coaches

- Howard Brown
- Peter Compise
- Jim Gruden
- Hal Hunter
- Jim Johnson
- Bob Otolski
- Timmy Redebaugh
- Ray Shands
- Trent Walters
- Morris Watts

Legend

- (C) Team captain
- (S) Suspended
- (I) Ineligible
- Injured
- Redshirt

== Statistics ==
=== Passing ===
Player	Comp	Att	Yards	TD	INT
Willie Jones	76	135	881	5	

=== Rushing ===
Player	Att	Yards	TD
Ken Starling	180	676	2

=== Receiving ===
Player	Rec	Yards	TD
Trent Smock	36	505	5

== Awards ==
All-Big Ten (1st Team)

- Bill Armstrong, SE
- John Babcock, C
- Chuck Sukurs, C
- Jim Wenzel, P
