= Jim Lash =

American football player (1951–2019)

No. 82, 87
- Position: Wide receiver

Personal information
- Born: November 12, 1951; Akron, Ohio, U.S.
- Died: May 31, 2019 (aged 67)
- Listed height: 6 ft 1 in (1.85 m)
- Listed weight: 200 lb (91 kg)

Career information
- High school: Garfield (Akron)
- College: Northwestern
- NFL draft: 1973: 3rd round, 65th overall pick

Career history
- Minnesota Vikings (1973–1976); San Francisco 49ers (1976–1977)

Awards and highlights
- First-team All-Big Ten (1972)

Career NFL statistics
- Receptions: 91
- Receiving yards: 1,464
- Receiving touchdowns: 4
- Stats at Pro Football Reference

James Verle Lash (November 12, 1951 – 31 May 2019) was an American professional football player who was a wide receiver in the National Football League (NFL) in the 1970s. He played on two Super Bowl teams with the Minnesota Vikings.

Lash attended Garfield High School in Akron, Ohio, the same high school that fellow NFL wide receiver Steve Craig attended. He played college football for the Northwestern Wildcats. His five-year pro career was spent with the Vikings in which he helped lead to Super Bowl VIII, Super Bowl IX and Super Bowl XI all coming up a bit short against the dynasty teams of the Miami Dolphins, the Pittsburgh Steelers and the Oakland Raiders.

Lash died May 31, 2019, in his hometown of Akron, Ohio.
