= 1973 Illinois Fighting Illini football team =

American college football season

1973 Illinois Fighting Illini football
- Conference: Big Ten Conference
- Record: 5–6 (4–4 Big Ten)
- Head coach: Bob Blackman (3rd season)
- MVPs: Eddie Jenkins; Octavus Morgan
- Captains: John Gann; Ken Braid
- Home stadium: Memorial Stadium

1973 Big Ten Conference football standings
	Conf.					Overall
Team	W		L		T	W		L		T
No. 2 Ohio State +	7	–	0	–	1	10	–	0	–	1
No. 6 Michigan +	7	–	0	–	1	10	–	0	–	1
Minnesota	6	–	2	–	0	7	–	4	–	0
Illinois	4	–	4	–	0	5	–	6	–	0
Michigan State	4	–	4	–	0	5	–	6	–	0
Purdue	4	–	4	–	0	5	–	6	–	0
Northwestern	4	–	4	–	0	4	–	7	–	0
Wisconsin	3	–	5	–	0	4	–	7	–	0
Indiana	0	–	8	–	0	2	–	9	–	0
Iowa	0	–	8	–	0	0	–	11	–	0
+ – Conference co-champions; Rankings from AP Poll

The 1973 Illinois Fighting Illini football team was an American football team that represented the University of Illinois as a member of the Big Ten Conference during the 1973 Big Ten season. In their third year under head coach Bob Blackman, the Fighting Illini compiled a 5–6 record (4–4 in conference games), finished in a four-way tie for fourth place in the Big Ten, and outscored opponents by a total of 164 to 157.

The team's statistical leaders included quarterback Jeff Hollenbach (916 passing yards, 43.8% completion percentage), running back George Uremovich (519 rushing yards, 3.7 yards per carry), and split end Garvin Roberson (25 receptions for 416 yards, 16.6 yards per reception). Halfback Eddie Jenkins and defensive end Octavus Morgan were selected as the team's most valuable players. Roberson, defensive lineman Octavus Morgan, and defensive back Mike Gow received first-team honors on the 1973 All-Big Ten Conference football team.

The team played its home games at Memorial Stadium in Champaign, Illinois.

== Schedule ==
Date	Time	Opponent	Site	Result	Attendance	Source
September 15		at Indiana	Memorial Stadium; Bloomington, IN (rivalry)	W 28–14	51,433	
September 22	3:30 p.m.	at California*	California Memorial Stadium; Berkeley, CA	W 27–7	22,000	
September 29		West Virginia*	Memorial Stadium; Champaign, IL	L 10–17	48,107	
October 6	2:57 p.m.	Stanford*	Memorial Stadium; Champaign, IL	L 0–24	45,383	
October 13		Purdue	Memorial Stadium; Champaign, IL (rivalry)	W 15–13	54,252	
October 20		at Michigan State	Spartan Stadium; East Lansing, MI	W 6–3	63,303	
October 27		Iowa	Memorial Stadium; Champaign, IL	W 50–0	46,864	
November 3		No. 1 Ohio State	Memorial Stadium; Champaign, IL (Illibuck)	L 0–30	60,707	
November 10		at No. 4 Michigan	Michigan Stadium; Ann Arbor, MI (rivalry)	L 6–21	76,461	
November 17		Minnesota	Memorial Stadium; Champaign, IL	L 16–19	34,438	
November 24		at Northwestern	Dyche Stadium; Evanston, IL (rivalry)	L 6–9	26,117	
*Non-conference game; Rankings from AP Poll released prior to the game; All times are in Central time

== Personnel ==
1973 Illinois Fighting Illini football team roster
Players
Coaches
Offense

Pos.	#	Name	Class
QB	19	Jeff Hollenbach	Jr
RB	23	Eddie Jenkins	Sr
QB	11	Tom McCartney	Sr
RB	33	Lonnie Perrin	Jr
WR		Garvin Roberson
RB		George Uremovich

Defense

Pos.	#	Name	Class
DL	40	Octavius Morgan	Sr

Special teams

Pos.	#	Name	Class
P		Phil Vierneisel

Head coach

- Bob Blackman

Coordinators/assistant coaches

Legend

- (C) Team captain
- (S) Suspended
- (I) Ineligible
- Injured
- Redshirt

Roster
