= 1972 All-Big Ten Conference football team =

American college football all-star team

The 1972 All-Big Ten Conference football team consists of American football players chosen by various organizations for All-Big Ten Conference teams for the 1972 Big Ten Conference football season. The teams selected by the Big Ten coaches for the United Press International (UPI) were led by Michigan with seven first-team selections, Michigan State with five first-team selections, and Ohio State with four first-team selections.

== Offensive selections ==
=== Quarterbacks ===
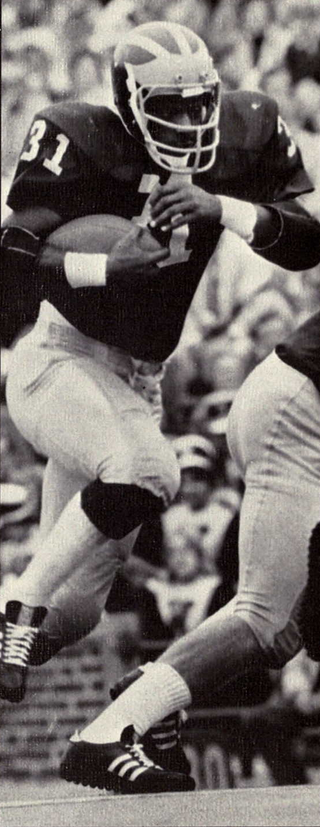
Michigan back Ed Shuttlesworth

- Mike Wells, Illinois (AP-1; UPI-1)
- Dennis Franklin, Michigan (AP-2; UPI-2)

=== Backs ===
- Otis Armstrong, Purdue (AP-1; UPI-1)
- Rufus Ferguson, Wisconsin (AP-1; UPI-2)
- John King, Minnesota (AP-1; UPI-2)
- Ed Shuttlesworth, Michigan (UPI-1)
- Harold Henson, Ohio State (AP-2; UPI-2)
- Greg Boykin, Northwestern (AP-2)
- Ken Starling, Indiana (AP-2)

=== Flankers ===
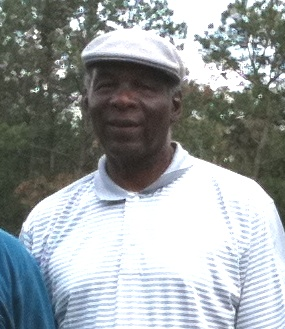
Michigan State tight end Billy Joe Dupree

- Glenn Scolnik, Indiana (AP-1 [end]; UPI-1)

=== Split ends ===
- Jim Lash, Northwestern (UPI-1)
- Garvin Roberson, Illinois (AP-2 [end]; UPI-2)

=== Tight ends ===
- Steve Craig, Northwestern (AP-1 [end]; UPI-1)
- Billy Joe DuPree, Michigan State (AP-2 [end]; UPI-1)

=== Tackles ===
- Paul Seymour, Michigan (AP-1; UPI-1)
- John Hicks, Ohio State (AP-1; UPI-1)
- Bill Geiger, Indiana (AP-2)
- John Muller, Iowa (AP-2)
- Jim Coode, Michigan (UPI-2)
- James Nicholson, Michigan State (UPI-2)

=== Guards ===
- Joe DeLamielleure, Michigan State (AP-1; UPI-1)
- Tom Coyle, Michigan (AP-1; UPI-1)
- Charles Bonica, Ohio State (AP-2; UPI-1)
- Keith Nosbusch, Wisconsin (AP-2; UPI-2)

=== Centers ===
- Larry McCarren, Illinois (AP-1; UPI-1)
- Bill Hart, Michigan (AP-2)
- Mike Webster, Wisconsin (UPI-2)

== Defensive selections ==
=== Linemen ===
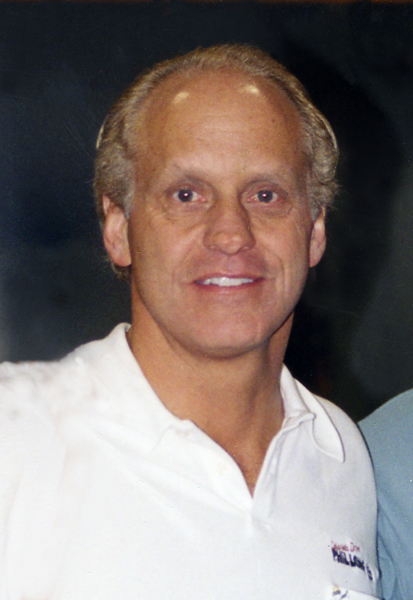
Ohio State linebacker Randy Gradishar

- Steve Baumgartner, Purdue (AP-1 [front four]; UPI-1 [end])
- Dave Butz, Purdue (AP-1 [front four]; UPI-1 [tackle])
- Fred Grambau, Michigan (AP-1 [front four]; UPI-1 [tackle])
- George Hasenohrl, Ohio State (AP-1 [front four]; UPI-1 [tackle])
- Clint Spearman, Michigan (UPI-1 [end])
- Gary Van Elst, Michigan State (AP-2 [front four]; UPI-2 [tackle])
- Larry Allen, Illinois (UPI-2 [end])
- Jim Anderson, Northwestern (AP-2 [front four])
- Tab Bennett, Illinois (AP-2 [front four])
- Brian McConnell, Michigan State (UPI-2 [end])

=== Linebackers ===
- Gregg Bingham, Purdue (AP-1 [middle guard]; UPI-1)
- Gail Clark, Michigan State (AP-1; UPI-1)
- Randy Gradishar, Ohio State (AP-1; UPI-1)
- Dave Lokanc, Wisconsin (AP-1; UPI-2)
- Mike Fulk, Indiana (AP-2; UPI-2)
- Tom Kee, Michigan (AP-2; UPI-2)
- Andre Jackson, Iowa (AP-2)

=== Defensive backs ===
- Randy Logan, Michigan (AP-1; UPI-1)
- Bill Simpson, Michigan State (AP-1; UPI-1)
- Brad Van Pelt, Michigan State (AP-1; UPI-1)
- Dave Brown, Michigan (AP-2; UPI-1)
- Rick Penney, Iowa (AP-2)
- Tim Alderson, Minnesota (UPI-2)
- Earl Houthitt, Iowa (UPI-2)
- Richard Seifert, Ohio State (UPI-2)
- Greg Strunk, Northwestern (AP-2; UPI-2)

== Key ==
AP = Associated Press, selected by the AP's Midwest Football Board

UPI = United Press International, selected by the Big Ten Conference coaches

Bold = Consensus first-team selection of AP and UPI

== See also ==
- 1972 College Football All-America Team
