= 1973 Purdue Boilermakers football team =

American college football season

1973 Purdue Boilermakers football
- Conference: Big Ten Conference
- Record: 5–6 (4–4 Big Ten)
- Head coach: Alex Agase (1st season)
- MVP: Bo Bobrowski
- Captains: Bo Bobrowski; Tim Racke
- Home stadium: Ross–Ade Stadium

1973 Big Ten Conference football standings
	Conf.					Overall
Team	W		L		T	W		L		T
No. 2 Ohio State +	7	–	0	–	1	10	–	0	–	1
No. 6 Michigan +	7	–	0	–	1	10	–	0	–	1
Minnesota	6	–	2	–	0	7	–	4	–	0
Illinois	4	–	4	–	0	5	–	6	–	0
Michigan State	4	–	4	–	0	5	–	6	–	0
Purdue	4	–	4	–	0	5	–	6	–	0
Northwestern	4	–	4	–	0	4	–	7	–	0
Wisconsin	3	–	5	–	0	4	–	7	–	0
Indiana	0	–	8	–	0	2	–	9	–	0
Iowa	0	–	8	–	0	0	–	11	–	0
+ – Conference co-champions; Rankings from AP Poll

The 1973 Purdue Boilermakers football team represented Purdue University in the 1973 Big Ten Conference football season. Led by first-year head coach Alex Agase, the Boilermakers compiled an overall record of 5–6 with a mark of 4–4 in conference play, placing in a four-way tie for fourth in the Big Ten. Purdue played home games at Ross–Ade Stadium in West Lafayette, Indiana.

== Schedule ==
Date	Time	Opponent	Site	Result	Attendance	Source
September 15		at Wisconsin	Camp Randall Stadium; Madison, WI	W 14–13	58,265	
September 22	1:30 p.m.	Miami (OH)*	Ross–Ade Stadium; West Lafayette, IN	L 19–24	53,973	
September 29		No. 7 Notre Dame*	Ross–Ade Stadium; West Lafayette, IN (rivalry)	L 7–20	69,391	
October 6		Duke*	Ross–Ade Stadium; West Lafayette, IN	W 27–7	53,241	
October 13		at Illinois	Memorial Stadium; Champaign, IL (rivalry)	L 13–15	54,252	
October 20		Northwestern^{†}	Ross–Ade Stadium; West Lafayette, IN	W 21–10	57,657	
October 27		Michigan State	Ross–Ade Stadium; West Lafayette, IN	L 7–10	55,291	
November 3		at Iowa	Kinnick Stadium; Iowa City, IA	W 48–23	39,120	
November 10		at Minnesota	Memorial Stadium; Minneapolis, MN	L 7–34	36,890	
November 17		No. 4 Michigan	Ross–Ade Stadium; West Lafayette, IN	L 9–34	56,485	
November 24		at Indiana	Memorial Stadium; Bloomington, IN (Old Oaken Bucket)	W 28–23	44,789	
*Non-conference game; ^{†}Homecoming; Rankings from AP Poll released prior to the game

== Game summaries ==
=== Northwestern ===
Team	1	2	3	4	Total
Northwestern	0	3	0	7	10
• Purdue	7	7	7	0	21

- Date: October 20
- Location: Ross–Ade Stadium, West Lafayette, Indiana
- Game attendance: 57,657

Scoring summary
1	PUR	Northington 6 yard run (Conner kick)	Purdue 7–0
2	NW	Blazevich field goal	Purdue 7–3
2	PUR	Bobrowski 1 yard run (Conner kick)	Purdue 14–3
3	PUR	Bobrowski 12 yard run (Conner kick)	Purdue 21–3
4	NW	Kev 3 yard run (Blazevich kick)	Purdue 21–10

=== Michigan State ===
- Bo Bobrowski 24 rushes, 125 yards

=== At Iowa ===
- Mike Northington 31 rushes, 146 yards
- Bo Bobrowski 10 rushes, 123 yards

=== At Indiana ===
- Pete Gross 29 rushes, 174 yards
- Bo Bobrowski 17 rushes, 114 yards

== Roster ==
1973 Purdue Boilermakers football team roster
Players
Coaches
Offense

Pos.	#	Name	Class
QB		Bo Bobrowski
WR	22	Larry Burton	Jr
RB		Scott Dierking
C	51	Frank DiLieto	Sr
FB	35	Pete Gross	Jr
RB		Bob Herrick
RB		Tim Hunter
RB		Roy Kidd
OT	77	Ken Long	So
QB		Craig Nagel
RB		Mike Northington
WR		Errol Patterson
G	69	Ralph Perretta	Jr
RB		Skip Peterson
RB		Mike Pruitt
G	68	Jeff Romack	Sr
WR		Dan Roman
TE		Barry Santini
OT	64	Steve Schaefer	Sr
QB		Mike Terrizzi
TE		Joe Walling

Defense

Pos.	#	Name	Class
DB		Carl Capria
LB		Randy Clark
DB		Fred Cooper
DB		Alex DiMarzo
LB		Cedric Evans
LB		Mark Gefert
DL		Mark Gorgal
DL		Bob Hofiezer
MG		Chuck Keever
DB		Bill Knox
DT	74	Ken Novak	So
DL		Steve Nurrenbern
DL		Rick Oliver
DL		Stan Parker
DB		Tim Racke
LB		Rick Schavietello
DL		Joe Tenkman
DB		Jim Wood
DL		Jon Zwitt

Special teams

Pos.	#	Name	Class
K	1	Frank Conner	So
K		Steve Schmidt	So

Head coach

- Alex Agase

Coordinators/assistant coaches

- George Catavolos
- Tom Roggeman

Legend

- (C) Team captain
- (S) Suspended
- (I) Ineligible
- Injured
- Redshirt
