= Vic Koegel =

American football player (born 1951)

No. 50
- Position: Linebacker

Personal information
- Born: November 2, 1952 (age 74); Cincinnati, Ohio, U.S.
- Listed height: 6 ft 0 in (1.83 m)
- Listed weight: 215 lb (98 kg)

Career information
- High school: Archbishop Moeller
- College: Ohio State
- NFL draft: 1974: 12th round, 304th overall pick

Career history
- Atlanta Falcons (1974)*; Cincinnati Bengals (1974)
- * Offseason or practice squad member only
- Stats at Pro Football Reference

Victor Aloysius Koegel (born November 2, 1952) is an American former professional football player who was a linebacker for the Cincinnati Bengals of the National Football League (NFL). He played college football for the Ohio State University
