= Mike Varty =

American football player (born 1952)

No. 58, 51
- Position: Linebacker

Personal information
- Born: February 10, 1952 (age 74); Detroit, Michigan, U.S.
- Listed height: 6 ft 1 in (1.85 m)
- Listed weight: 223 lb (101 kg)

Career information
- College: Northwestern
- NFL draft: 1974: 7th round, 180th overall pick

Career history
- Washington Redskins (1974); Baltimore Colts (1975)

Awards and highlights
- First-team All-Big Ten (1973)
- Stats at Pro Football Reference

Michael Scott Matthew Varty (born February 10, 1952) is an American former professional football player who was a linebacker in the National Football League (NFL) for the Washington Redskins and Baltimore Colts. He played college football for the Northwestern Wildcats and was selected 180th overall in the seventh round of the 1974 NFL draft.
