= Frank Lauterbur =

American football player, coach, and administrator (1925–2013)

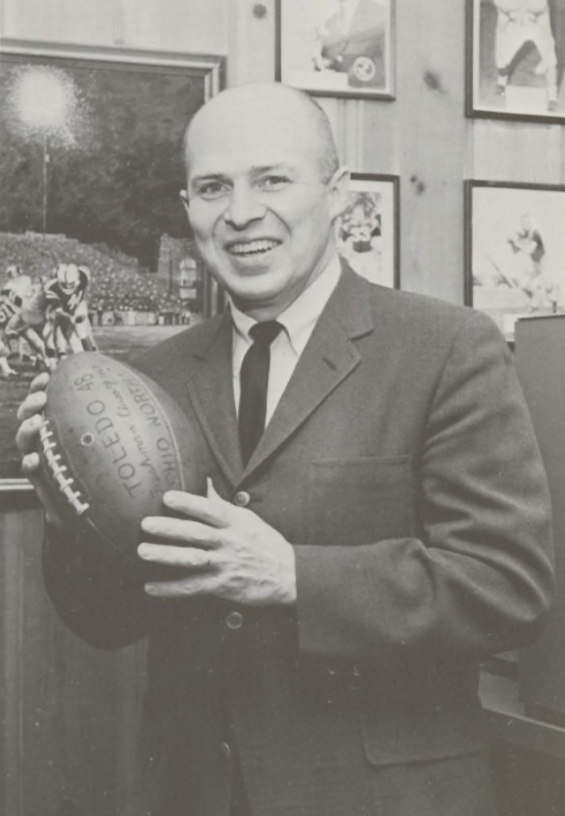
- Lauterbur from the 1968 Blockhouse

Biographical details
- Born: August 8, 1925; Cincinnati, Ohio, U.S.
- Died: November 20, 2013 (aged 88); Toledo, Ohio, U.S.

Playing career
- 1940s: Mount Union

Coaching career (HC unless noted)
- 1953–1954: Kent State (assistant)
- 1955–1956: Baltimore Colts (assistant)
- 1957–1961: Army (OL)
- 1962: Pittsburgh (assistant)
- 1963–1970: Toledo
- 1971–1973: Iowa
- 1975–1977: Baltimore Colts (DB)
- 1978–1981: Los Angeles Rams (LB)
- 1982: Seattle Seahawks (DL)
- 1984: Pittsburgh Maulers (DL)
- 1985: Orlando Renegades (DC/LB)

Administrative career (AD unless noted)
- 1963–1970: Toledo

Head coaching record
- Overall: 52–60–3
- Bowls: 2–0

Accomplishments and honors

Championships
- 3 MAC (1967, 1969–1970)

Awards
- 3× MAC Coach of the Year (1967, 1969–1970)

Francis Xavier Lauterbur (August 8, 1925 – November 20, 2013) was an American football player and coach. He served as the head coach at the University of Toledo from 1963 to 1970 and at the University of Iowa from 1971 to 1973, compiling a career college football record of 52–60–3. Lauterbur was also an assistant coach in the National Football League (NFL).

== Early life and playing career ==
Lauterbur was born in Cincinnati, Ohio, but when his widowed mother remarried, he moved north to Michigan. He played high school football at University of Detroit Jesuit High School. Lauterbur served in the United States Marine Corps during World War II before going to college. He returned to Ohio and played three years of college football at Mount Union College.

== Early coaching career ==
Lauterbur began his coaching career at Wickliffe and Collinwood high schools near Cleveland, Ohio. He spent two years as an assistant coach at Kent State University from 1953 to 1954, followed by two years as an assistant coach with the Baltimore Colts of the National Football League (NFL). Lauterbur wanted to return to college football, so he left the Colts to take a job as the offensive line coach at the United States Military Academy under head coach Earl Blaik in 1957.

He spent five years at West Point, including the undefeated 1958 season that featured Heisman Trophy winner Pete Dawkins. He then served as an assistant coach for one season at the University of Pittsburgh in 1962. Lauterbur was offered his first college head coaching job by the University of Toledo before the 1963 season. He was Toledo's head football coach and athletic director for eight years, from 1963 to 1970.

Lauterbur struggled his first four seasons at Toledo, compiling an 11–27–1 record from 1963 to 1966. But he eventually turned the program around, going 9–1 in 1967 and winning the first Mid-American Conference title in school history. He then led Toledo to consecutive undefeated seasons in 1969 and 1970. Toledo was riding a 23-game winning streak and had won consecutive Tangerine Bowls at the end of the 1970 season. Lauterbur had led Toledo to a 37–5–1 record in his final four years, including three conference titles, two bowl victories, and a number 14 ranking in the final AP Poll in 1970. All these accomplishments caught the eye of Bump Elliott, the athletic director of the University of Iowa.

== Iowa coaching career ==
Lauterbur was hired as the 22nd head coach in the history of Iowa football before the 1971 season. He was expected to bring strong defense to Iowa, since his 1970 Toledo team had led the nation in total defense and pass defense and ranked second in the nation in scoring defense.

Iowa went just 1–10 in Lauterbur's first season in 1971, which was not a big surprise, considering that Iowa had graduated 17 starters off of a team that had won just three games the previous season. In 1972, Iowa improved to 3–7–1 and played competitively in most of the losses. Several players were set to return in 1973, and it looked as though progress was being made.

The 1973 season was a disaster. Iowa finished with the worst record in school history. The Hawkeyes lost all 11 games in 1973 to finish the year 0–11. The only other winless season in Iowa history occurred in 1889, their inaugural campaign, when they lost the only game they scheduled that year.

Despite the 0–11 record, Lauterbur had two years left on a five-year contract, and Elliott considered retaining him. Iowa fans were unhappy with Lauterbur, obviously, but they were more unhappy with defensive coordinator Ducky Lewis. Lewis' defensive units, so spectacular at Toledo, were horrible at Iowa. In 1973, Iowa yielded 401 points on the season, the most in school history. In addition, Lewis was notoriously profane in public, which embarrassed and appalled several fans. That might be tolerated if Iowa was winning, but not at 0–11.

Elliott approached Lauterbur about firing Lewis as defensive coordinator. Lauterbur refused, stating that he had to have full control of his staff and that it was his right, not Elliott's, to hire and fire assistant coaches. Elliott agreed, but then reminded Lauterbur that it was his right, as athletic director, to hire and fire head football coaches by relieving him of his duties as Iowa head coach.

Lauterbur's loyalty to his assistant backfired, as now Lauterbur and Lewis were both out of a job. Ron Maly, a reporter for the Des Moines Register, wrote, "On the day he was fired, Lauterbur held an umbrella over my head so he could protect the notepad I was using from the rain that was falling near the stadium. He was a good guy, but Iowa clearly was not the right place for him."

== Later career ==
Lauterbur spent the rest of his career as a pro assistant. He worked for years as an assistant coach for the Los Angeles Rams, coaching in Super Bowl XIV in 1980. He also coached in the United States Football League (USFL) for the Pittsburgh Maulers. After retiring from coaching, Lauterbur worked for a decade with the National Scouting Service.

== Retirement ==
Lauterbur retired in 1993 and lived in Ohio. He had a wife, Mary, as well as four children and two grandchildren. He died at a Toledo nursing home of dementia and Parkinson's disease in 2013, aged 88.

== Head coaching record ==
Year	Team	Overall	Conference	Standing	Bowl/playoffs	Coaches^{#}	AP^{°}
Toledo Rockets (Mid-American Conference) (1963–1970)
1963	Toledo	2–7	1–5	T–6th			
1964	Toledo	2–8	1–5	7th			
1965	Toledo	5–5	2–4	T–5th			
1966	Toledo	2–7–1	1–5	T–6th			
1967	Toledo	9–1	5–1	1st			
1968	Toledo	5–4–1	3–2–1	T–3rd			
1969	Toledo	11–0	5–0	1st	W Tangerine		
1970	Toledo	12–0	5–0	1st	W Tangerine	17	12
Toledo:		48–32–2	24–22–1				
Iowa Hawkeyes (Big Ten Conference) (1971–1973)
1971	Iowa	1–10	1–8	10th			
1972	Iowa	3–7–1	2–6–1	8th			
1973	Iowa	0–11	0–8	T–9th			
Iowa:		4–28–1	3–22–1				
Total:		52–60–3					
National championship Conference title Conference division title or championship game berth
^{#}Rankings from final Coaches Poll.; ^{°}Rankings from final AP Poll.
