= Rick Middleton (American football) =

American football player (born 1951)

No. 54, 57
- Position: Linebacker

Personal information
- Born: November 28, 1951 (age 74); Columbus, Ohio, U.S.
- Listed height: 6 ft 2 in (1.88 m)
- Listed weight: 228 lb (103 kg)

Career information
- High school: Rutherford B. Hayes (OH)
- College: Ohio State
- NFL draft: 1974: 1st round, 13th overall pick

Career history
- New Orleans Saints (1974–1975); San Diego Chargers (1976–1978)

Awards and highlights
- First-team All-Big Ten (1973)

Career NFL statistics
- Sacks: 1.5
- Fumble recoveries: 3
- Interceptions: 2
- Stats at Pro Football Reference

Richard Ray Middleton (born November 28, 1951) is an American former professional football player who was a linebacker in the National Football League (NFL) from 1974 through 1978. He attended Rutherford B. Hayes High School (Delaware, Ohio) and played college football at the Ohio State University.

He is now a High School History/Psychology/Government Teacher at Olentangy High School.
