= Steve Craig (American football) =

American football player (born 1951)

No. 84
- Position: Tight end

Personal information
- Born: March 13, 1951 (age 75); Pittsburgh, Pennsylvania, U.S.
- Listed height: 6 ft 3 in (1.91 m)
- Listed weight: 231 lb (105 kg)

Career information
- High school: Garfield (Akron, Ohio)
- College: Northwestern
- NFL draft: 1974: 3rd round, 64th overall pick

Career history
- Minnesota Vikings (1974–1978)

Awards and highlights
- 2× First-team All-Big Ten (1972, 1973)

Career NFL statistics
- Receptions: 18
- Receiving yards: 172
- Receiving TDs: 1
- Stats at Pro Football Reference

Steve Craig (born March 13, 1951) is an American former professional football player who was a tight end in the National Football League (NFL) from 1974 to 1978 and played in two Super Bowls. He attended Garfield High School in Akron, Ohio, the same high school fellow NFL receiver Jim Lash attended, and Northwestern University. Craig was selected in round three of the 1974 NFL draft by the Minnesota Vikings. His five-year pro-career was spent with the Minnesota Vikings, during which time which he helped lead the team to Super Bowl IX and Super Bowl XI appearances.

Career NFL statistics
| Year | Games | Receptions | Yards | Y/R | TD |
|---|---|---|---|---|---|
| 1974 | 14 | 4 | 26 | 6.5 | 1 |
| 1975 | 14 | 6 | 68 | 11.3 | 0 |
| 1976 | 14 | 3 | 33 | 11.0 | 0 |
| 1977 | 14 | 1 | 14 | 14.0 | 0 |
| 1978 | 16 | 4 | 31 | 7.8 | 0 |
| TOTAL | 72 | 18 | 172 | 9.6 | 1 |

== Sources ==
- Pro Football Reference
- Database Football
