= Bill Simpson (American football) =

American football player (born 1951)

No. 48, 45
- Position: Safety

Personal information
- Born: December 5, 1951 (age 74); Detroit, Michigan, U.S.
- Listed height: 6 ft 1 in (1.85 m)
- Listed weight: 184 lb (83 kg)

Career information
- High school: Shrine (Royal Oak, Michigan)
- College: Michigan State
- NFL draft: 1974: 2nd round, 50th overall pick

Career history
- Los Angeles Rams (1974–1978); Buffalo Bills (1980–1982)

Awards and highlights
- PFWA All-Rookie Team (1974); 2× First-team All-Big Ten (1972, 1973)

Career NFL statistics
- Interceptions: 34
- Fumble recoveries: 10
- Sacks: 5
- Safeties: 1
- Stats at Pro Football Reference

William Thomas Simpson (born December 5, 1951) is an American former professional football player who was a defensive back in the National Football League (NFL) from 1974 to 1982. Before his NFL career, he played defensive back and punted for Michigan State University and was selected by the Los Angeles Rams in the second round of the 1974 NFL draft. He was a standout athlete at Royal Oak Shrine High School and was elected to the Archdiocese of Detroit Catholic High School League Hall of Fame in 2007.

== Professional career ==
Simpson played five seasons with the Los Angeles Rams (1974–1978) which culminated in his receiving several postseason awards. He finished his pro career with the Buffalo Bills (1980–1982), retiring with 34 interceptions and 9 more in postseason play.

During the 1981 Wild Card playoff game, played on December 27, 1981, at Shea Stadium, Simpson intercepted a pass near the end zone in the closing seconds of the game to preserve a win for the Bills over the New York Jets

== Personal life ==
Simpson is the father of Brett Simpson, a 2009 and 2010 US Open of Surfing champion.
