= Ken Starch =

American football player (born 1954)

No. 32
- Position: Running back

Personal information
- Born: March 5, 1954 (age 72); Madison, Wisconsin, U.S.
- Listed height: 5 ft 11 in (1.80 m)
- Listed weight: 219 lb (99 kg)

Career information
- High school: Madison East
- College: Wisconsin
- NFL draft: 1976: undrafted

Career history
- Green Bay Packers (1976); Montreal Alouettes (1978)

Career NFL statistics
- Games played: 6
- Stats at Pro Football Reference

Kenneth Earl Starch (born March 5, 1954) is an American former professional football player who was a running back for the Green Bay Packers of the National Football League (NFL) in 1976. He played college football for the Wisconsin Badgers. Starch also briefly played for the Oakland Raiders in the NFL, and the Montreal Alouettes of the Canadian Football League (CFL).
