= Steve Neils =

American football player (born 1951)

No. 53
- Position: Linebacker

Personal information
- Born: May 2, 1951 (age 75); St. Peter, Minnesota, U.S.
- Listed height: 6 ft 2 in (1.88 m)
- Listed weight: 217 lb (98 kg)

Career information
- High school: St. Peter
- College: Minnesota
- NFL draft: 1974: 5th round, 111th overall pick

Career history
- St. Louis Cardinals (1974–1980)

Awards and highlights
- First-team All-Big Ten (1973)

Career NFL statistics
- Interceptions: 1
- INT yards: 18
- Games: 88
- Stats at Pro Football Reference

Steven Lynn Neils (born May 2, 1951) is a former linebacker in the National Football League (NFL) who played his entire career for the St. Louis Cardinals. After a college career at Minnesota, Neils was selected in the fifth round of the 1974 NFL draft.

Over eighty-eight professional games, he had one interception and seven recovered fumbles, running one back 72 yards for a touchdown.
