= Morris Bradshaw =

American football player (1952–2025)

No. 81, 88
- Position: Wide receiver

Personal information
- Born: October 29, 1952; Highland, Illinois, U.S.
- Died: January 3, 2025 (aged 72)
- Listed height: 6 ft 1 in (1.85 m)
- Listed weight: 195 lb (88 kg)

Career information
- High school: Edwardsville (Edwardsville, Illinois)
- College: Ohio State
- NFL draft: 1974: 4th round, 93rd overall pick

Career history
- Oakland Raiders (1974–1981); New England Patriots (1982); Oakland Invaders (1984)

Awards and highlights
- Super Bowl champion (XI, XV)

Career NFL statistics
- Receptions: 90
- Receiving yards: 1,416
- Receiving touchdowns: 12
- Stats at Pro Football Reference

Morris Bradshaw (October 29, 1952 – January 3, 2025) was an American professional football player who was a wide receiver in the National Football League (NFL), primarily for the Oakland Raiders. He played college football for the Ohio State Buckeyes and was selected by the Raiders in the fourth round of the 1974 NFL draft. He played in 104 games with 26 starts and had 84 receptions for 1,305 yards and 11 touchdowns. Bradshaw was a member of the Raiders Super Bowl XI and XV championship squads.

Bradshaw went on to play one season with the New England Patriots. He had six receptions for 111 yards and one touchdown for the Patriots in eight games during the 1982 regular season. His longest reception for the Patriots was 48 yards in their 16–0 shutout of the Seahawks at the Kingdome on December 19, 1982. He also recovered his own fumble in this game.

His only touchdown reception as a Patriot wide receiver was an 11-yard pass from Steve Grogan, with 11 seconds left in the 1st half, in their 30–19 victory over the Buffalo Bills at Schaefer Stadium on January 2, 1983, thereby allowing them to make the playoffs.

Bradshaw died on January 3, 2025, at the age of 72.
