= Champ Henson =

American football player (born 1953)

No. 38
- Position: Running back

Personal information
- Born: June 1, 1953 (age 73); Columbus, Ohio, U.S.
- Listed height: 6 ft 3 in (1.91 m)
- Listed weight: 240 lb (109 kg)

Career information
- High school: Teays Valley (Ashville, Ohio)
- College: Ohio State
- NFL draft: 1975: 4th round, 89th overall pick

Career history
- Cincinnati Bengals (1975)

Awards and highlights
- Second-team All-Big Ten (1972); 1972 NCAA Touchdown Leader - 20; 1972 NCAA Rushing Touchdown Leader - 20; 1972 NCAA Scoring Leader- 120

Career NFL statistics
- Rushing attempts: 11
- Rushing yards: 38
- Stats at Pro Football Reference

Harold R. "Champ" Henson III (born June 1, 1953) is an American former professional football player who was a fullback for the Cincinnati Bengals of the National Football League (NFL). He played college football for the Ohio State Buckeyes.

Henson attended Ohio State University, where he led the nation in scoring as a sophomore in 1972. In the second game of the 1973 season, however, Henson tore the cartilage in his knee and was out for the season. Linebacker Bruce Elia was converted to starting fullback. In his senior season, Henson was hampered by the lingering effects of his knee injury and challenged by sophomore Pete Johnson.

Henson was selected in the fourth round of the 1975 NFL draft by the Minnesota Vikings, who then traded him to the Cincinnati Bengals.

Statistics

Henson's statistics are as follows:

Ohio State Buckeyes
Season	Rushing				Receiving			
Season	Att	Yards	Avg	TD	Rec	Yards	Avg	TD
1971	Did Not Play							
1972	193	795	4.1	20	1	6	6.0	0
1973	27	107	4.0	4	0	0	0.0	0
1974	88	433	4.9	12	0	0	0.0	0
Totals	308	1,335	4.3	36	1	6	6.0	0

== Political career ==
In March 2012, Harold was selected as the Republican nominee for Pickaway County Commissioner by a 67–33 margin. He was unopposed in the November election, where he received over 16,000 votes. His term ran through January 2015. In 2016, Henson was once again nominated as the Republican nominee for Commissioner by receiving more than 60 percent of the vote and defeated his two general election opponents.

Election Results

Pickaway County Commissioner General Election, 2016
Party	Candidate	Votes	%
Republican	Harold Henson	13,795	60.48
Independent	Michael R. Parks	1,889	8.28
Democratic	Warren R. Spangler	7,127	31.24

Pickaway County Commissioner Republican Primary, 2016
Party	Candidate	Votes	%
Republican	Harold Henson	7,329	100.00

Pickaway County Commissioner General Election, 2012
Party	Candidate	Votes	%
Republican	Harold Henson	16,061	100.00

Pickaway County Commissioner Republican Primary, 2012
Party	Candidate	Votes	%
Republican	Harold Henson	4,646	67.24
Republican	Sereana Dresbach	2,264	32.76

== See also ==
- List of NCAA major college football yearly scoring leaders
