= Matt Herkenhoff =

American football player (born 1951)

No. 60
- Position: Offensive tackle

Personal information
- Born: April 2, 1951 (age 75); Melrose, Minnesota, U.S.
- Listed height: 6 ft 4 in (1.93 m)
- Listed weight: 267 lb (121 kg)

Career information
- High school: Melrose
- College: Minnesota
- NFL draft: 1974: 4th round, 94th overall pick

Career history
- New York Stars/Charlotte Hornets (1974); Kansas City Chiefs (1976–1985)

Career NFL statistics
- Games played: 125
- Games started: 117
- Fumble recoveries: 2
- Stats at Pro Football Reference

Matthew Bernard Herkenhoff (born April 2, 1951) is an American former professional football player who was an offensive tackle in the National Football League (NFL). He played for the Kansas City Chiefs between 1976 and 1985. He played for the New York Stars/Charlotte Hornets of the World Football League (WFL) in 1974. He played college football for the Minnesota Golden Gophers.
