= Cornelius Greene =

American gridiron football player (born 1954)

Profile
- Position: Quarterback

Personal information
- Born: January 21, 1954 (age 72); Washington, D.C., U.S.
- Listed height: 5 ft 11 in (1.80 m)
- Listed weight: 170 lb (77 kg)

Career information
- High school: Dunbar (Washington, D.C.)
- College: Ohio State
- NFL draft: 1976: 11th round, 318th overall pick

Career history
- Dallas Cowboys (1976)*; Seattle Seahawks (1976)*; BC Lions (1977)*; Columbus Stingers (1977); Columbus Metros (1978–1979)
- * Offseason or practice squad member only

Awards and highlights
- First-team All-American (1975); Big Ten Most Valuable Player (1975); 2× First-team All-Big Ten (1974, 1975); Rose Bowl MVP (1974)

Cornelius Greene (born January 21, 1954) is an American former college football player who was a quarterback for the Ohio State Buckeyes. In 1973, he was the first African American quarterback to ever start for Ohio State, and was an All-American and the Big Ten Most Valuable Player in 1975.

== Early life ==
Greene was born in 1954 and grew up in Washington, D.C. At 9 years old, Greene was at the Washington Monument the day Martin Luther King gave his 'I have a dream' speech. This day changed the course of his entire life, giving him the strength to carry on, using it as his beacon of hope.

He later attended Dunbar High School, where he played basketball, baseball and football, playing quarterback and also playing defense for his high school football team.

== College career ==
In 1972, he accepted a football scholarship from Ohio State University, to play under head coach Woody Hayes. As a sophomore in 1973, he was named the starter at quarterback over Greg Hare, becoming the first African American starting quarterback at Ohio State. After winning the position, Greene received upwards of 50 hate letters a week, and consistent death threats. That season he led the 1973 team to an undefeated season, 10–0–1, and won the 1974 Rose Bowl MVP. As a senior in 1975, he was named a first-team All-American and won Big Ten Most Valuable Player. His teammate Archie Griffin, who had won the two previous MVP's, missed winning a third straight, instead became the first two-time Heisman Trophy winner. In 1975, Greene won Team MVP by one vote, denying Archie Griffin a third straight award. Griffin graciously voted for Greene that year.

Greene compiled a 31–3–1 record, winning four Big Ten Conference championships, and playing in four Rose Bowls, three as the starting quarterback. In recognition of his career accomplishments, he was inducted into the Ohio State Athletics Hall of Fame in 1998, also honored with the induction into the Rose Bowl Hall of Fame in 2019.

Although his teams were based on run-oriented offenses, he still held the record of most career passing yards in school history for many years. He finished with 138-of-251 (55.0 percent) attempts for 2,255 yards and 17 touchdowns, while having 409 carries for 2,014 yards (4.9 YPC) and 28 touchdowns.

== Professional career ==
Greene was selected by the Dallas Cowboys in the eleventh round (318th overall) of the 1976 NFL draft to play him at wide receiver. He was waived on August 23, 1976. He was claimed off waivers by the Seattle Seahawks the next day. He was waived again before the start of the regular season on September 7. Greene joined the BC Lions of the Canadian Football League in October 1976 for a five-day tryout, but did not sign a contract.

He signed a contract with the Lions after the season in March 1977. He was released before the start of the regular season in June. He signed with the Columbus Stingers of the Midwest Football League in July.

Greene played with the Columbus Metros in the Midwest Football League in 1978. The Metros joined the Mid-Atlantic Football League in 1979, and he played wide receiver for Columbus.

== Personal life ==
In 1982, he moved back to his hometown of Washington, D.C., to work for the city and to manage a recreation center. He is a faculty member and multi-sport coach at St. Albans School.
