= Bruce Elia =

American football player (born 1953)

No. 50, 51, 55
- Position: Linebacker

Personal information
- Born: January 10, 1953 (age 73); Hoboken, New Jersey, U.S.
- Listed height: 6 ft 1 in (1.85 m)
- Listed weight: 220 lb (100 kg)

Career information
- High school: Cliffside Park (MJ)
- College: Ohio State
- NFL draft: 1975: 4th round, 100th overall pick

Career history
- Miami Dolphins (1975); San Francisco 49ers (1976–1978)

Awards and highlights
- Second-team All-Big Ten (1974)

Career NFL statistics
- Games played: 55
- Games started: 9
- Fumble recoveries: 2
- Stats at Pro Football Reference

Bruce Louis Elia (born January 10, 1953) is an American former professional football player who was a linebacker in the National Football League (NFL). He played college football on both the offensive and defensive teams for the Ohio State Buckeyes. Professionally, he was a linebacker, primarily with the San Francisco 49ers.

== Early years ==
Elia is one of the few Ohio State players in the modern era to start on both the offensive and defensive teams. He grew up in Cliffside Park, New Jersey and graduated from Cliffside Park High School in 1971, where he had played as both a running back and linebacker. He was recruited to Ohio State by head coach Woody Hayes as a fullback. Before the third game of the 1972 season, Elia was claimed by The Ohio State defensive coordinator, and made into a linebacker.

Early in the 1973 season starting fullback Champ Henson was injured, and freshman backup Pete Johnson was judged unready to take over. Hayes moved Elia back to the offense as fullback. That season Elia led the Buckeyes in scoring (14 touchdowns for 84 points). In 1974, he returned to linebacker and was the team's leading tackler (144 - 74 solo, 70 assisted).

== NFL career ==
Elia was selected in the fourth round of the 1975 NFL draft by the Miami Dolphins as a linebacker. Prior to the 1976 season he was taken by the Tampa Bay Buccaneers in the expansion draft. Tampa then traded Elia, wide receiver Willie McGee and a second-round draft pick to the San Francisco 49ers for quarterback Steve Spurrier. Elia spent the next three years with the 49ers.

== After football ==
Elia is currently a real estate broker in Fort Lee, New Jersey and resides in Cliffside Park.
