= Archie Griffin =

American football player (born 1954)

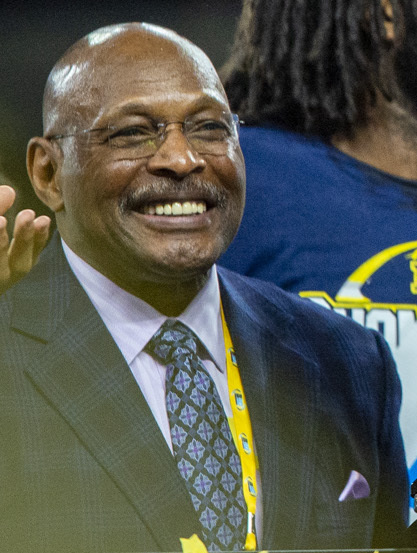
- Griffin in 2022

No. 45
- Position: Running back

Personal information
- Born: August 21, 1954 (age 72); Columbus, Ohio, U.S.
- Listed height: 5 ft 9 in (1.75 m)
- Listed weight: 189 lb (86 kg)

Career information
- High school: Eastmoor (Columbus)
- College: Ohio State (1972–1975)
- NFL draft: 1976: 1st round, 24th overall pick

Career history
- Cincinnati Bengals (1976–1982); Jacksonville Bulls (1985)

Awards and highlights
- 2× Heisman Trophy (1974, 1975); SN Athlete of the Year (1975); 2× Unanimous All-American (1974, 1975); First-team All-American (1973); 2× Big Ten Most Valuable Player (1973, 1974); Second-team AP All-Time All-American (2025); Ohio State Buckeyes No. 45 retired

Career NFL statistics
- Rushing yards: 2,808
- Rushing average: 4.1
- Rushing touchdowns: 7
- Receptions: 192
- Receiving yards: 1,607
- Receiving touchdowns: 6
- Stats at Pro Football Reference
- College Football Hall of Fame

Archie Mason Griffin (born August 21, 1954) is an American former professional football running back who played in the National Football League (NFL) for seven seasons with the Cincinnati Bengals. He won the Heisman Trophy twice between 1974 and 1975 during his college football with the Ohio State Buckeyes and is the only player to receive the award multiple times.

As a member of the Buckeyes, Griffin set the NCAA records for rushing yards and consecutive games with 100 rushing yards while becoming the first player to lead the Big Ten Conference in rushing for three consecutive years. Griffin also won four Big Ten Conference titles and was the first player to start in four Rose Bowls. His additional accolades include SN Athlete of the Year, two consecutive Unanimous All-American selections, and two consecutive Big Ten Most Valuable Player awards.

Griffin was selected in the first round in the 1976 NFL draft by the Bengals and was a member of the team that made the franchise's Super Bowl debut in Super Bowl XVI. Following his seven seasons in Cincinnati, he last played professionally in 1985 for the Jacksonville Bulls of the United States Football League (USFL). He was inducted to the College Football Hall of Fame in 1986.

== Early life ==
Griffin rushed for 1,787 yards and scored over 170 points in 11 games, including 29 touchdowns, as a senior fullback at Eastmoor High School (now Eastmoor Academy) in Columbus, Ohio. That year, he led Eastmoor to the Columbus City League championship, rushing for 267 yards on 31 carries in the title game against Linden-McKinley High School. In his junior year, Griffin also rushed for over 1,000 yards.

In 1996, Griffin was inducted into the National High School Hall of Fame, with Eastmoor Academy renaming their playing field "Archie Griffin Field" in his honor. In 2023, he was inducted into the National High School Football Hall of Fame as part of its inaugural class.

== College career ==
Griffin played for the Buckeyes at Ohio State University from 1972 to 1975. When he won a starting position his freshman year, many sophomores were disappointed because Griffin took their spot. Former Ohio State head coach Woody Hayes said of Griffin, "He's a better young man than he is a football player, and he's the best football player I've ever seen."

In 1972, Griffin was a T-formation halfback, and from 1973 through 1975, he was the team's I-formation tailback. He led the Buckeyes in rushing as a freshman with 867 yards, but his numbers exploded the following year with the team's conversion to the I-formation. He rushed for 1,428 yards in the regular season as a sophomore, 1,620 as a junior, 1,357 as a senior. Griffin was the only back to lead the Big Ten Conference in rushing for three straight years until Jonathan Taylor did so from 2017 to 2019. Overall, Griffin rushed for 5,589 yards on 924 carries in his four seasons with the Buckeyes (1972–1975), then an NCAA record. He had 6,559 all-purpose yards and scored 26 touchdowns. In their four seasons with Griffin as their starting running back, the Buckeyes posted a record of 40–5–1. Griffin is one of only two players in collegiate football history to start four Rose Bowl games, the other being Brian Cushing.

Griffin introduced himself to OSU fans as a freshman by setting a school single-game rushing record of 239 yards in the second game of the 1972 season, against North Carolina, breaking a team record that had stood for 27 seasons. His only carry in his first game had resulted in a fumble. He broke his own record as a sophomore with 246 rushing yards in a game against the Iowa Hawkeyes. Over his four-year collegiate career, Griffin rushed for at least 100 yards in 34 games, including an NCAA record 31 consecutive games.

=== Honors ===
Griffin finished fifth in the Heisman vote in his sophomore year and won the award as a junior and senior. He is the only NCAA football player to date to win the award twice. In addition to his two Heisman Trophies, Griffin won many other college awards. He is one of four players to win the Big Ten Most Valuable Player twice (1973–1974). United Press International named him Player of the Year twice (1974–1975), Walter Camp Foundation named him player of the year twice (1974–1975), The Sporting News named him Player of the Year twice (1974–1975) and Athlete of the Year (1975), and he won the Maxwell Award (1975).

The College Football Hall of Fame enshrined Griffin in 1986. Ohio State enshrined him in their own Ohio State Athletics Hall of Fame in 1981 and officially retired his number, 45, in 1999. He was inducted into the Rose Bowl Hall of Fame in 1990. On January 1, 2014, Griffin was named the 1970s player of the decade in the Rose Bowl All-Century Class during the celebration of the 100th Rose Bowl Game (2014).

In 2013, Griffin was inducted into the International Sports Hall of Fame. In 2020, he was ranked No. 4 on ESPN's list of the Top 150 players in college football history.

On August 17, 2024, Griffin was honored with a statue and a legacy walk in the Rose Bowl. On August 30, 2024, Griffin was honored with a statue outside Ohio Stadium.

== Professional career ==
In the 1976 NFL draft, Griffin was selected in the first round, 24th overall, by the Cincinnati Bengals. He played all seven seasons in the NFL with the Bengals, from 1976 to 1982. He was joined in the backfield by his college fullback teammate Pete Johnson, drafted by the Bengals in 1977, and his brother and Ohio State defensive back Ray Griffin, drafted in 1978. Griffin rushed for 2808 career yards and 7 touchdowns, and caught 192 passes for 1607 yards and 6 touchdowns. Griffin suffered a significant achilles tendon injury in 1980 that compromised his speed and cost him the starting running back position. He played in Super Bowl XVI with the Bengals in 1982. He finished the game with one carry for four yards, and muffed a kick return in the 26–21 loss.

Following the end of his Bengals career, Griffin played very briefly with the Jacksonville Bulls of the United States Football League (USFL). He played in one game and had ten carries for 11 yards.

== Career statistics ==
=== NFL ===
Legend
**Bold**	Career high

==== Regular season ====
Year	Team	Games		Rushing					Receiving				
Year	Team	GP	GS	Att	Yds	Avg	Lng	TD	Rec	Yds	Avg	Lng	TD
1976	CIN	14	14	138	625	4.5	**77**	**3**	16	138	8.6	23	0
1977	CIN	12	11	137	549	4.0	31	0	28	240	8.6	24	0
1978	CIN	**16**	8	132	484	3.7	30	0	35	284	8.1	27	**3**
1979	CIN	**16**	**15**	**140**	**688**	**4.9**	63	0	**43**	**417**	**9.7**	**52**	2
1980	CIN	15	7	85	260	3.1	14	0	28	196	7.0	19	0
1981	CIN	**16**	2	47	163	3.5	23	**3**	20	160	8.0	17	1
1982	CIN	9	0	12	39	3.3	10	1	22	172	7.8	22	0
		98	57	691	2,808	4.1	77	7	192	1,607	8.4	52	6

==== Playoffs ====
Year	Team	Games		Rushing					Receiving				
Year	Team	GP	GS	Att	Yds	Avg	Lng	TD	Rec	Yds	Avg	Lng	TD
1981	CIN	**3**	0	2	8	4.0	4	0	0	0	0.0	0	0
1982	CIN	1	0	**3**	**17**	**5.7**	**8**	0	**3**	**14**	**4.7**	**6**	0
		4	0	5	25	5.0	8	0	3	14	4.7	6	0

=== College ===
Legend
	Led the NCAA
**Bold**	Career high

Season	Team	Rushing			
Season	Team	Att	Yds	Avg	TD
1972	Ohio State	139	772	5.6	3
1973	Ohio State	225	1,428	6.3	6
1974	Ohio State	236	**1,620**	**6.9**	**12**
1975	Ohio State	**245**	1,357	5.5	4
Career		845	5,177	6.1	25

== Post-football career ==
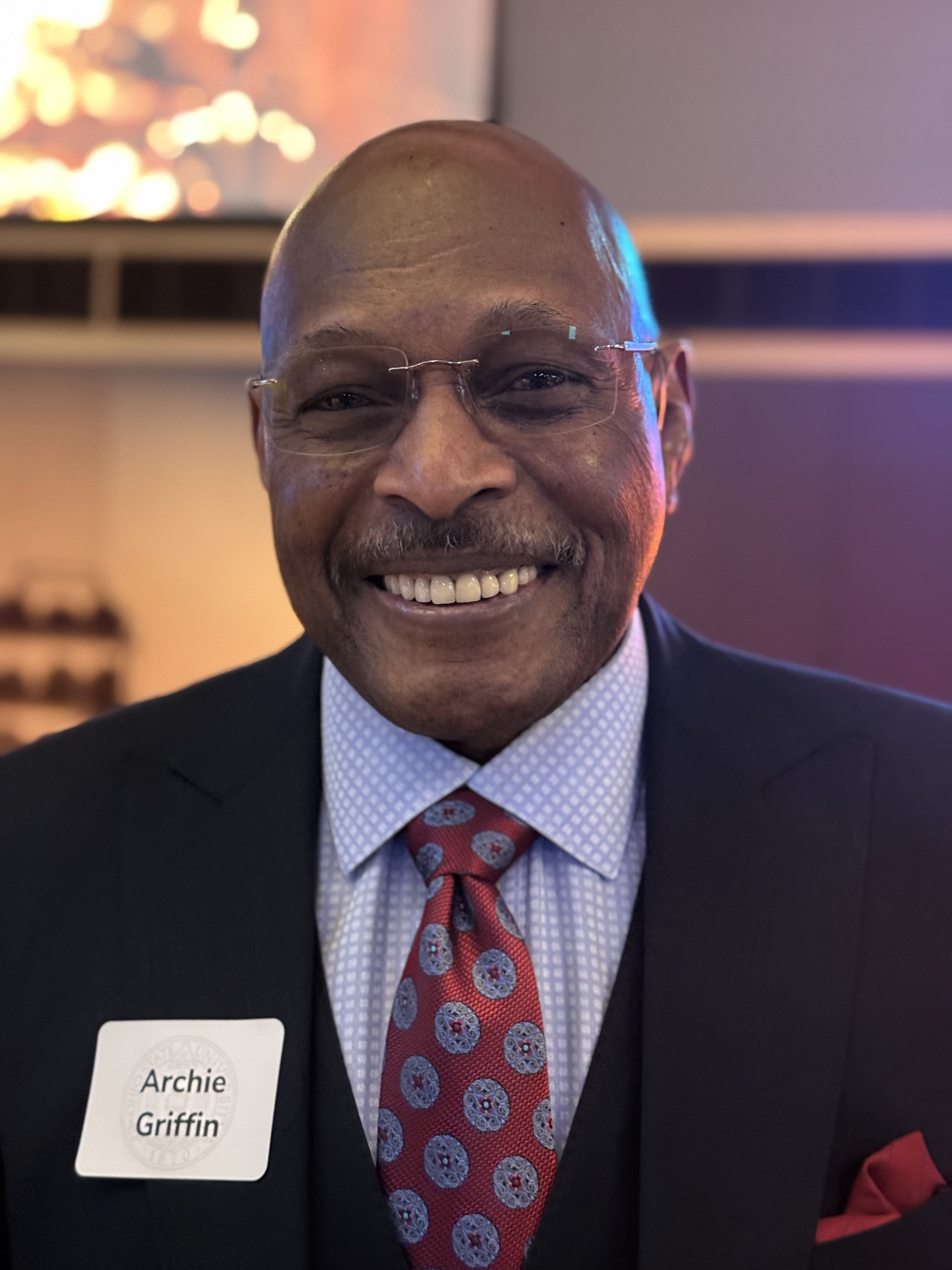
Griffin in December 2024

Griffin is the former president and CEO of the Ohio State University Alumni Association. He is also the current spokesman for the Wendy's High School Heisman award program. Formerly, he served as assistant athletic director for the university and speaks to the football team before every game. He meets fans in the alumni suite, including opposing fans.

Griffin also serves on the board of directors for Motorists Insurance, which has offices in downtown Columbus, Abercrombie and Fitch, and the National Football Foundation and College Hall of Fame, based in Irving, Texas.

Along with former National Basketball Association basketball player Magic Johnson, Griffin was one of the investors in Mandalay Baseball Properties LLC, which owned the Dayton Dragons, a single-A Minor League affiliate of the Cincinnati Reds, prior to the sale of the team in 2014 to Palisades Arcadia Baseball LLC.

On August 31, 2024, Griffin dotted the "i" during Ohio State's home opener.

== Family ==
Griffin is a son of Margaret and James Griffin. He has six brothers and a sister. His brothers include Raymond, a former NFL cornerback and a teammate with the Bengals, and Keith who also played in the NFL.

In 2024, Griffin's son Andre became the head football coach at Notre Dame-Cathedral Latin School and was previously an assistant football coach at Ohio Northern University. Another son, Adam, played as a defensive back for Ohio State for three seasons until a shoulder injury ended his playing career. Griffin also has three grandsons.

== See also ==
- List of NCAA major college football yearly rushing leaders

Preceded by Ed Marinaro	NCAA Division I FBS career rushing yards record 1975–1976	Succeeded by Tony Dorsett
