= Bubba Wyche =

American gridiron football player (born 1946)

No. 18
- Position: Quarterback

Personal information
- Born: April 4, 1946 (age 80)

Career information
- College: Tennessee

Career history
- Saskatchewan Roughriders (1969, 1971–1972); Chicago Fire (1974); Detroit Wheels (1974); Shreveport Steamers (1975)

Career CFL statistics
- TD–INT: 4–11
- Passing yards: 1,057

Bubba Wyche (born April 4, 1946) is a former American and Canadian football quarterback in the Canadian Football League (CFL) and World Football League (WFL). He played in the CFL for the Saskatchewan Roughriders and the WFL for the Chicago Fire, Detroit Wheels, and Shreveport Steamers. After playing for North Fulton High School, Wyche played college football at Tennessee.

His brother, Sam Wyche, played and coached in the National Football League (NFL). Former Major League Baseball player Bubba Trammell, a Tennessee native, was named after him.
