= Matthew Reed =

American gridiron football player (born 1951)

Profile
- Position: Quarterback

Personal information
- Born: November 30, 1951 (age 74); Winnfield, Louisiana, U.S.

Career information
- College: Grambling

Career history
- 1974: Birmingham Americans
- 1975: Birmingham Vulcans
- 1976–1977: Toronto Argonauts
- 1977–1978: Calgary Stampeders

Matthew Reed (born November 30, 1951) is an American former professional football player. He played as a quarterback in the World Football League (WFL) and the Canadian Football League (CFL).

A graduate of Grambling State University, Reed was a tenth-round selection (240th overall pick) of the Buffalo Bills in the 1973 NFL draft but did not play in the league. Reed began his pro career with the Birmingham Americans of the WFL. In 1974, he backed up George Mira, completing 77 of 188 passes (41%) for 1345 yards and 11 touchdowns and 12 interceptions. He was part of their championship team. In 1975, he became the starter of the newly renamed Birmingham Vulcans, but had a poor year, completing only 38.9% of his 208 passes, for 1252 yards and only 4 touchdowns and 11 interceptions. He did rush for 347 yards and 6 touchdowns. In the WFL's short history, Reed managed to be the league's 10th leading passer (in yards).

Reed later played three years in the CFL, all as a backup quarterback. He played 18 games for the Toronto Argonauts in 1976 and 1977 and finished his pro career with the Calgary Stampeders in 1977 and 1978. While with the Argonauts, Reed backed up CFL star Chuck Ealey. As noted in the Toronto sports press, this was the first time in professional football that a team had a tandem of black quarterbacks running a team.
