= Jack Gotta =

American and Canadian football player (1929–2013)

Profile
- Positions: Wide receiver, Defensive back

Personal information
- Born: November 14, 1929; Ironwood, Michigan, U.S.
- Died: June 29, 2013 (aged 83); Calgary, Alberta, Canada
- Listed height: 6 ft 4 in (1.93 m)
- Listed weight: 220 lb (100 kg)

Career information
- College: Oregon State

Career history

Playing
- 1956–1959: Calgary Stampeders
- 1960–1964: Saskatchewan Roughriders
- 1964: Montreal Alouettes

Coaching
- 1970–1973: Ottawa Rough Riders
- 1974: Birmingham Americans (WFL)
- 1977–1979: Calgary Stampeders
- 1982–1983: Calgary Stampeders
- 1985–1986: Saskatchewan Roughriders

Operations
- 1974: Birmingham Americans (WFL)
- 1975: Birmingham Vulcans (WFL)
- 1977–1983: Calgary Stampeders

Awards and highlights
- 3× CFL West All-Star (1957, 1958, 1961); 3× Annis Stukus Trophy (1972, 1973, 1978); 2× Grey Cup champion (1966, 1973); World Bowl champion (1974)

Head coaching record
- Regular season: CFL: 83–82–5 (.503); WFL: 15–5 (.750)
- Postseason: CFL: 6–5 (.545); WFL: 2–0 (1.000)
- Career: CFL: 89–87–5 (.506); WFL: 17–5 (.773)

Jack "Jocko" Gotta (November 14, 1929 – June 29, 2013) was an American-born Canadian professional football player, coach, and general manager.

Gotta played tight end at Oregon State in 1952 and Hamilton Air Force Base from 1954 to 1956. He signed with the Cleveland Browns in 1956, but was cut and played with the Calgary Stampeders of the Canadian Football League (CFL) from 1957 to 1959. In 1960 he signed with the Saskatchewan Roughriders. He sometimes played corner linebacker and safety due to injuries on defense. During the 1964 season he was cut by Saskatchewan and signed by the Montreal Alouettes.

In 1965 he rejoined the Roughriders as an assistant coach. He resigned after the 1967 season and joined the Ottawa Rough Riders coaching staff. In 1970 he replaced the retiring Frank Clair as head coach. The team went from first to last place, however the team made the playoffs every year afterwards. He had a 30–26 record in his four seasons as Ottawa's head coach, winning the Grey Cup in 1973 and the Annis Stukus Trophy in 1972 and 1973.

In 1974, he jumped to the World Football League's Birmingham Americans as head coach and general manager. The Americans, led by George Mira, Charley Harraway, and Dennis Homan, finished with a 15–5 record and won the only WFL World Bowl at Birmingham's Legion Field, defeating the Florida Blazers 22–21.

In 1975 the Americans folded, new ownership was brought in and the team renamed themselves the Vulcans. Gotta stayed on as General Manager only. The team had a league best 9–3 record when the WFL folded. He returned to the CFL in 1977 as head coach/general manager of the Calgary Stampeders. He retired as coach after four seasons, but remained on as GM.

When Jerry Williams resigned as head coach after the 1981 CFL season, he returned to the sidelines. He remained in Calgary until 1983, when he was fired after missing the playoffs.

In total of two stints with Calgary, he finished with a 42–34–4 record and won Coach of the Year in 1978 to become the first coach to win the honor three times; he was later passed by Don Matthews.

In 1984 he joined the CFL on CTV as a commentator. He left the network to become head coach of the Saskatchewan Roughriders in 1985. In two seasons with the Green Riders he had an 11–22–1 record,

== Personal life ==
Gotta was married to his wife Joni for over 50 years and had four children. In the last few years of his life, Gotta suffered from Alzheimer's disease. A naturalized resident of Canada, Gotta was noted in his obituary as having loved the city of Calgary and its people.

Gotta died on June 29, 2013, in Calgary.

== See also ==
- List of Grey Cup–winning head coaches
