= Southern California Sun =

Defunct American football team

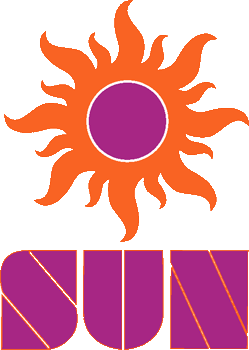
Logo

General information
- Founded: 1974
- Folded: October 22, 1975
- Stadium: Anaheim Stadium
- Headquartered: Anaheim, California
- Colours: Magenta and orange

Personnel
- Owner: Larry Hatfield
- General manager: Curly Morrison
- Head coach: Tom Fears

League / conference affiliations
- World Football League; Western Division

The Southern California Sun were an American football team based in Anaheim, California, that played in the World Football League in 1974 and 1975. Their records were 13–7 in 1974 and 7–5 in 1975. Their home stadium was Anaheim Stadium. They were coached by former Rams great and Hall of Famer Tom Fears and owned by trucking magnate Larry Hatfield.

Former USC greats Anthony Davis and Pat Haden played for the Sun in 1975, along with former Oakland Raiders QB Daryle Lamonica, also known as the "Mad Bomber."

The Sun won the 1974 Western Division title but lost their playoff game against the Hawaiians when three of their best players–Kermit Johnson, James McAlister, and Booker Brown—sat out the game. The three players were owed back pay and claimed the missed checks breached their contracts. A year later, they were leading the West when the league folded on October 22, 1975, in midseason.

== Schedule and results ==
Key:	Win	Loss	Bye

=== 1974 regular season ===
Week	Date	Opponent	Result	Record	Venue	Attendance
1	July 10	at Birmingham Americans	L 7–11	0–1	Legion Field	53,231
2	July 17	Hawaiians	W 38–31	1–1	Anaheim Stadium	32,018
3	July 24	at Jacksonville Sharks	W 21–19	2–1	Gator Bowl	46,780
4	August 1	at Memphis Southmen	L 15–25	2–2	Liberty Bowl Memorial Stadium	25,175
5	August 7	New York Stars	L 8–11	2–3	Anaheim Stadium	28,174
6	August 15	at Houston Texans	W 18–7	3–3	Astrodome	31,227
7	August 21	at Philadelphia Bell	W 31–28	4–3	John F. Kennedy Stadium	14,600
8	August 28	Portland Storm	W 45–15	5–3	Anaheim Stadium	27,814
9	September 2	Chicago Fire	L 22–32	5–4	Anaheim Stadium	27,133
10	September 6	at Detroit Wheels	W 10–7	6–4	Rynearson Stadium	6,351
11	September 11	at Chicago Fire	W 31–28	7–4	Soldier Field	24,837
12	September 18	Detroit Wheels	W 29–24	8–4	Anaheim Stadium	12,169
13	September 25	Jacksonville Sharks	W 57–7	9–4	Anaheim Stadium	22,017
14	October 2	at Portland Storm	W 26–22	10–4	Civic Stadium	20,469
15	October 10	Shreveport Steamer	W 25–23	11–4	Anaheim Stadium	24,223
16	October 17	Birmingham Americans	W 29–25	12–4	Anaheim Stadium	25,247
17	October 23	Philadelphia Bell	L 7–45	12–5	Anaheim Stadium	26,412
18	October 30	at Charlotte Hornets	W 34–25	13–5	American Legion Memorial Stadium	19,436
19	November 6	at Hawaiians	L 8–29	13–6	Honolulu Stadium	13,780
20	November 14	Florida Blazers	L 24–27	13–7	Anaheim Stadium	28,213

=== Playoffs ===
Round	Date	Opponent	Result	Record	Venue	Attendance
Quarterfinals	November 20	Hawaiians	L 14–32	0–1	Anaheim Stadium	11,430

=== 1975 regular season ===
Week	Date	Opponent	Result	Venue	Record	Attendance	Source
1	August 3	Portland Thunder	W 21–15	Anaheim Stadium	1–0	14,362	
2	August 9	at San Antonio Wings	L 22–54	Alamo Stadium	1–1	21,000	
3	August 16	at Hawaiians	W 37–19	Honolulu Stadium	2–1	15,862	
4	August 23	at Birmingham Vulcans	W 35–25	Legion Field	3–1	32,000	
5	August 29	Philadelphia Bell	W 58–39	Anaheim Stadium	4–1	17,811	
6	September 6	at San Antonio Wings	L 8–30	Alamo Stadium	4–2	10,470	
7	September 14	Charlotte Hornets	L 22–30	Anaheim Stadium	4–3	13,405	
8	September 20	at Shreveport Steamer	L 29–38	State Fair Stadium	4–4	18,777	
9	September 27	at Charlotte Hornets	W 24–17	American Legion Memorial Stadium	5–4	17,000	
10	October 5	at Memphis Grizzlies	L 33–37	Memphis Memorial Stadium	5–5	18,129	
11	October 12	Shreveport Steamer	W 39–30	Anaheim Stadium	6–5	10,505	
12	October 19	at Hawaiians	W 26–7	Aloha Stadium	7–5	15,905	

== See also ==
- 1974 World Football League season
- 1975 World Football League season
