= Charlotte Hornets (WFL) =

World Football League team

General information
- Founded: January 1974
- Folded: September 1974
- Stadium: Downing Stadium (1974); American Legion Memorial Stadium (1974–1975)
- Headquartered: New York City (1974); Charlotte, North Carolina (1974–1975)
- Colours: Black and yellow

Personnel
- Owners: Howard Baldwin (1974); Upton Bell (1974–1975)
- General manager: Robert E. Keating
- Head coach: Vito Parilli

Nicknames
- New York Stars (1974); Charlotte Stars (1974); Charlotte Hornets (1974–1975)

League / conference affiliations
- World Football League; Eastern Division

The Charlotte Hornets were an American football team in the short-lived professional World Football League. Despite their brief existence, the Hornets were North Carolina's first attempt at a major league football team, predating the Carolina Panthers by two decades. They were relocated to Charlotte, North Carolina, from New York City in the middle of the 1974 season.

== History ==
=== Origins in Boston ===
The Charlotte Hornets franchise began as the Boston Bulls when the league awarded the Boston-area a franchise on January 15, 1974. They were owned by Howard Baldwin, president and minority owner of the New England Whalers of the World Hockey Association. Unlike most other WFL owners, he didn't have to pay a franchise fee because of his close ties to WFL founder and Commissioner Gary Davidson. He hired Vito "Babe" Parilli, who had been a backup to New York Jets quarterback Joe Namath in Super Bowl III, as head coach. Most of their home games were to be played at Nickerson Field with some late-season game possibly played at Schaefer Stadium.

In February 1974, the Bulls announced the franchise would be relocated to New York City. The move was initiated by league commissioner Gary Davidson. The Bulls coaches and players all were transferred to New York, with Baldwin remaining as owner and the original owner of the New York franchise Bob Schmertz (who was also majority owner of the New England Whalers and Boston Celtics) serving as Chairman of the Board. Schmertz then relinquished the rights of his original New York franchise and put it on the market for sale.

=== New York Stars ===
Finding a home field for the fledgling team in New York also proved difficult, partly due to bad timing. Yankee Stadium was closed for renovations right after the Yankees finished the 1973 season in October; it would not reopen until 1976. Shea Stadium was fully booked as the Yankees shared the park with the Mets as well as the NFL's Jets and Giants. (Giants Stadium, future home of both New York football teams, wouldn't open its doors until 1976.) The Stars had only two other options in the city proper: Downing Stadium, a 22,000-seat facility built during the Depression as a WPA Project on Randall's Island near the East River, or Baker Field, the 32,000-seat wooden stadium that served as the home of Columbia University's teams. Unable to come to terms with Columbia, Downing Stadium was ultimately chosen. The legendary Bob Sheppard, longtime voice of the New York Yankees, handled public address duties for the Stars.

Parilli signed a number of former Super Bowl III Jets including wide receiver George Sauer, who was coming out of retirement after three years, and former All-Pro defensive men Gerry Philbin, as well as John Elliott.

The WFL needed New York in order to have a presence in the largest U.S. media market. The Stars sold between 5,500 and 8,000 season tickets. After losing 14–7 at Jacksonville in front of a league high crowd of 59,112 at the Gator Bowl, the Stars' first home game against the Birmingham Americans attracted 17,943 New Yorkers. After leading 29–3 at halftime, the Stars were toppled by the efforts of Americans quarterback George Mira, who threw for three touchdowns and ran for another as Birmingham pulled out a 32–29 comeback win. The Stars achieved their first win as kicker Moses Lajterman kicked the winning field goal for a 17–15 win at Philadelphia. The Stars and Bell performed in front of the largest-ever WFL crowd, with 64,179 on hand; it later came out that most of the tickets were sold at large discounts or were given away free, to make the league appear more successful than it was.

New York then went on a tear, winning five in a row. Among the victims were the Jacksonville Sharks, Southern California Sun, Portland Storm, and Houston Texans. Coincidentally, the team's winning streak was stopped by those same Texans a week later, with a surprise addition to the Houston roster: John Matuszak, who had been AWOL from the NFL's Houston Oilers just 48 hours earlier. The Stars had mixed results in the next few weeks, beating Portland again, but losing to Florida in the rain and The Hawaiians in the sun. To improve the roster, New York picked up several NFL players from the waiver wire, including cornerback John Dockery (who played with Parilli for the Jets) and Don Highsmith, a running back released by Oakland who turned out to be a great addition to the Stars running attack.

The Stars could have been a real alternative to the NFL's Giants and Jets, both of whom were at historic low-points on the field. But despite their on-field success (and cheaper ticket prices), the Stars were dragged down by serious off-field financial problems; like most WFL teams, they were badly under-capitalized. The Stars opening-night crowd was the largest of the season; by September, they were drawing barely 5,000 per contest (ultimately, they drew just 74,692 total to their seven home games, an average of 10,670 per game, second-worst in the WFL.) Their fiscal structure began to founder when Schmertz's construction company ran into trouble. He was also involved in a nasty divorce, as well as a legal dispute over his ownership of the Celtics.

The Stars' biggest problem was Downing Stadium. Located on an island in the East River and accessible primarily on foot, it was nearly inaccessible from most parts of the city, and it had not been well-maintained in at least twenty years. (Indeed, it had hosted little football in that time, most notably a partial season of the old Continental Football League in 1966.) Schmertz pumped over $200,000 into renovations, but it wasn't enough to bring it to anything even approaching professional standards. The field was mostly sand and dirt, and amenities for fans, players and the press were virtually nonexistent. The toilets in the locker room frequently overflowed. During the home opener, the Stars' radio announcers John Sterling and Matt Snell had to sit on orange crates because there were no chairs in the press box; their Birmingham counterparts had to stand. Lighting was provided by four-decade-old light towers from Ebbets Field that were not nearly strong enough to completely illuminate the field. The lights were so dim that WFL's national television broadcaster, TVS, pronounced them unfit for broadcast and refused to air any games from the stadium.

It soon became obvious that Schmertz and Baldwin were in no position to finish the season. With the Stars over a million dollars in debt and a stadium that was inadequate even for temporary use, the WFL resigned itself to abandoning the nation's biggest market.

September 24, 1974 was their final game at New York, against the Detroit Wheels (the game was moved from Wednesday because of Yom Kippur). Coincidentally, that same day, the Wheels' 33 owners filed for bankruptcy, leading reporters to call the game the "Bankrupt Bowl." The Stars blew out the destitute Wheels, 37–7, in front of 4,220 fans. The game was originally scheduled to be carried nationally by TVS, but the network begged off. Even without Downing's inadequate lighting, it was clear by this time that both teams were headed for extinction.

=== Charlotte Stars/Hornets ===
While they were packing up for the next night's game against the Chicago Fire, Parilli announced the team was moving to Charlotte for the rest of the season as the Charlotte Stars. Part-owner Bob Keating told reporters that poor attendance and Downing Stadium's substandard playing conditions made it impossible for the team to go on in New York.

The league had found a buyer in Upton Bell, the son and heir of former NFL commissioner Bert Bell and himself a former executive with the New England Patriots, after Charlotte mayor John M. Belk helped engineer a deal that made the move feasible. Forced to find a new logo literally at the last minute, the equipment man simply stuck the Chicago Bears' "C" logo over the old New York logo. Despite everything, the Stars—renamed the Hornets a few days later—put out the Fire, 41–30. Shortly after they arrived in Charlotte, however, their uniforms were impounded due to an unpaid laundry bill from New York; the Hornets had to practice in shorts and T-shirts until Bell posted a bond for the equipment. The team's first home game at Charlotte (the city's first-ever "big league" franchise) was a rousing success, selling out all 25,133 tickets at American Legion Memorial Stadium, leaving some 5,000 out of luck. The visiting Memphis Southmen ruined their debut, winning 27–23. In four games at Charlotte, the Hornets sold over 80,000 tickets compared to just 75,000 in seven games at Downing Stadium.

Toward the end of the season, the Hornets struggled on the field, losing their last four games. Off the field, things were not much better, as Bell was still scrambling to get more financing; a public offering hadn't attracted any investors. After their penultimate game, a federal judge ordered the seizure of most of the team's equipment (again) to compensate creditors back in New York.

Despite their late-season slump, the Hornets finished second in the Eastern Division behind the Florida Blazers, earning them a playoff spot and a date against the Blazers in Orlando. Unfortunately, by November 16, six days before the game, Florida had only sold 1,000 advance tickets (the final attendance was reported as 9,712), leading to concerns that the Hornets' cut of the gate would not even begin to meet their travel expenses. The players would have been lucky to get $100 for the game, nowhere near enough to justify the trip. League executive committee chairman and Memphis Southmen owner John F. Bassett called Bell and told him that the game was off. Bell had little choice but to agree. The players hadn't been paid since the third week of October, and he still hadn't been able to attract enough financing to field a team for 1975. Additionally, he was still paying Schmertz for buying the team. The Philadelphia Bell, who finished one game behind the Hornets (and with a losing record) but had somewhat more robust finances, replaced the Hornets as the second Eastern qualifier.

The Hornets returned for the 1975 campaign. Meanwhile, the reconstituted Chicago Winds franchise looked to sign quarterback Joe Namath, offering him a multi-million dollar contract to jump leagues. (Part of the deal called for Namath's eventual ownership of a WFL franchise in New York, which apparently would have involved moving the Hornets back to the Big Apple, perhaps playing in the refurbished Yankee Stadium.) But when Namath said no, league television partner TVS tore up its contract. The Hornets, like the rest of the league, felt the loss of TV coverage and revenue very hard. Despite fielding a competitive team (winning four in a row at one point), the Hornets didn't come close to selling out any of their contests in '75, drawing 43,761 fans for their four home games, less than half of capacity. Finally, the WFL ceased operations in mid-season, and the Hornets finished with a 6–5 record.

== Schedule and results ==
Key:	Win	Loss	Bye

=== 1974 regular season ===
Week	Day	Date	Opponent	Result	Attendance
1	Thursday	July 11, 1974	at Jacksonville Sharks	L 7–14	59,112
2	Wednesday	July 17, 1974	Birmingham Americans	L 29–32	17,943
3	Thursday	July 25, 1974	at Philadelphia Bell	W 17–15	64,719
4	Wednesday	July 31, 1974	Jacksonville Sharks	W 24–16	15,648
5	Wednesday	August 7, 1974	at Southern California Sun	W 11–8	28,174
6	Wednesday	August 14, 1974	Portland Storm	W 38–16	16,222
7	Wednesday	August 21, 1974	Houston Texans	W 43–10	12,042
8	Wednesday	August 28, 1974	at Houston Texans	L 11–14	10,126
9	Monday	September 2, 1974	Philadelphia Bell	W 24–16	6,132
10	Friday	September 6, 1974	Florida Blazers	L 15–17	3,830
11	Wednesday	September 11, 1974	at Portland Storm	W 34–15	13,339
12	Wednesday	September 18, 1974	at Hawaiians	L 14–17	12,169
13	Tuesday	September 24, 1974	Detroit Wheels	W 37–7	4,220
14	Thursday	October 3, 1974^{†}	at Chicago Fire	W 41–30	22,354
15	Wednesday	October 9, 1974^{‡}	Memphis Southmen	L 23–27	25,133
16	Wednesday	October 16, 1974	Chicago Fire	W 27–0	20,333
17	Wednesday	October 23, 1974	Florida Blazers	L 11–15	23,613
18	Wednesday	October 30, 1974	Southern California Sun	L 25–34	19,436
19	Wednesday	November 6, 1974	at Shreveport Steamer	L 14–19	10,697
20	Wednesday	November 13, 1974	at Memphis Southmen	L 22–28	13,339

† first game after announcing move to Charlotte
‡ first home game in Charlotte

=== 1975 regular season ===
Week	Day	Date	Opponent	Result	Venue	Attendance	Source
1	Sunday	July 26, 1975	at San Antonio Wings	L 10–27	Alamo Stadium	12,375	
2	Sunday	August 9, 1975	at Memphis Southmen	L 11–23	Memphis Memorial Stadium	19,729	
3	Sunday	August 16, 1975	San Antonio Wings	W 27–20	American Legion Memorial Stadium	8,447	
4	Sunday	August 30, 1975	at Jacksonville Express	W 33–14	Gator Bowl Stadium	16,428	
5	Saturday	September 6, 1975	Philadelphia Bell	W 10–0	American Legion Memorial Stadium	10,564	
6	Sunday	September 14, 1975	at Southern California Sun	W 30–22	Anaheim Stadium	13,405	
7	Sunday	September 21, 1975	at Birmingham Vulcans	L 16–22	Legion Field	18,500	
8	Saturday	September 27, 1975	Southern California Sun	L 17–24	American Legion Memorial Stadium	17,000	
9	Sunday	October 5, 1975	at Shreveport Steamer	W 39–14	State Fair Stadium	20,407	
10	Sunday	October 12, 1975	Jacksonville Express	W 22–15	American Legion Memorial Stadium	7,750	
11	Saturday	October 18, 1975	at Philadelphia Bell	L 10–18	Franklin Field	1,293	

== See also ==
- 1974 World Football League season
- 1975 World Football League season
