= 1975 World Football League season =

The 1975 World Football League season was the second and last season of the World Football League. The 1975 season was to be an 18-game season over a twenty-week schedule.

The WFL returned with a massive overhaul under new commissioner, Christopher Hemmeter. Four of the inaugural twelve teams returned from the 1974 season—The Hawaiians, the Southern California Sun, the Philadelphia Bell, and the Memphis Southmen—as did the Shreveport Steamer and Charlotte Hornets, who moved from Houston and New York City, respectively, midway through the 1974 season. New WFL teams replaced folded teams in Birmingham (where the Vulcans replaced the league champion Americans); Portland, Oregon (where the Thunder took the place of the Storm); Jacksonville (the Express took over for the Sharks); and Chicago (the Winds stepped into the place of the Fire). One new market was added when the Florida Blazers moved to become the San Antonio Wings; the Blazers and Detroit Wheels were not replaced in their home markets.

The Winds were expelled from the league five games into the season. They had essentially bet their existence on an attempt to woo New York Jets quarterback Joe Namath as their starting quarterback. The Winds all but promised that Namath was coming, and their failure to deliver him was a severe blow to the league's credibility. It also prompted TVS Television Network, the league's TV partner, to cancel its WFL coverage prior to the regular season, leaving the league untelevised with the exception of some local broadcasts.

Memphis and San Antonio won the first half of the split-season format and had secured playoff spots for the end of the season. The playoffs were to have six teams and World Bowl 2 was scheduled for Sunday, January 4, 1976. Without significant television and low attendance, the WFL ceased operations twelve weeks into the regular season on Wednesday, October 22. The Birmingham Vulcans had the league's best record (9–3) at the time of the shutdown.

== Draft ==
Because of the uncertainties facing the WFL, the 1974 WFL Draft was the only collegiate draft held by the league. In 1975, only a Pro Draft of entire NFL and CFL teams was done at its league meetings in Birmingham, Alabama. The professional football teams chosen were the following:

- Birmingham Vulcans: Atlanta Falcons, Kansas City Chiefs, and Winnipeg Blue Bombers.
- Charlotte Hornets: Baltimore Colts, Detroit Lions, and Buffalo Bills.
- Chicago Winds: Pittsburgh Steelers, New York Jets, and Edmonton Eskimos.
- The Hawaiians: San Francisco 49ers, Denver Broncos, and Philadelphia Eagles.
- Jacksonville Express: Miami Dolphins, Cleveland Browns, and Green Bay Packers.
- Memphis Southmen: Toronto Argonauts, St. Louis Cardinals, and New England Patriots.
- Philadelphia Bell: Montreal Alouettes, New York Giants, and Washington Redskins.
- Portland Thunder: Oakland Raiders, Minnesota Vikings, Ottawa Rough Riders, and Saskatchewan Roughriders.
- San Antonio Wings: Dallas Cowboys, Houston Oilers, Calgary Stampeders, and Hamilton Tiger-Cats.
- Shreveport Steamer: New Orleans Saints, Chicago Bears, and Cincinnati Bengals.
- Southern California Sun: Los Angeles Rams, BC Lions, and San Diego Chargers.

== Final standings ==
WFL teams: Western, Eastern

Eastern Division
Team	W	L	T	PCT	PF	PA
Birmingham Vulcans	9	3	0	.750	257	186
Memphis Southmen	7	4	0	.636	254	206
Charlotte Hornets	6	5	0	.545	225	199
Jacksonville Express	6	5	0	.545	227	247
Philadelphia Bell	4	7	0	.364	195	237
Western Division
Team	W	L	T	PCT	PF	PA
Southern California Sun	7	5	0	.583	354	341
San Antonio Wings	7	6	0	.538	364	268
Shreveport Steamer	5	7	0	.417	276	313
The Hawaiians	4	7	0	.364	210	281
Portland Thunder	4	7	0	.364	213	239
Chicago Winds	1	4	0	.200	67	125

W = Wins, L = Losses, T = Ties, PCT= Winning Percentage, PF = Points For, PA = Points Against

== See also ==
- 1974 World Football League season
