= Larry Matson =

American sportscaster

Larry James Matson is an American broadcaster and sports commentator. In 1974, he was the broadcast voice of the Birmingham Americans of the World Football League. He fulfilled the same duties for the successor Birmingham Vulcans in 1975. In 1977, he moved to New Orleans to serve as play-by-play announcer for Tulane University's ISP Sports Network.

From 1981 to 1986, he was the sports anchor for WWL-TV in New Orleans. Matson also became the play-by-play announcer for the New Orleans Saints of the National Football League in 1979. In 1986, he began working for WGNO-TV in New Orleans. In 1993, Matson served as assistant general manager for the New Orleans Zephyrs. He later became the play-by-play man for University of New Orleans men's basketball and McNeese State University football.

He returned to the Saints broadcast booth in 2000. In 2005, he returned to Tulane to do play-by-play for all Tulane Green Wave football and men's basketball games.

== Awards and honors ==
Matson is a six-time recipient of "Louisiana Broadcaster of the Year" honors from the National Sportscasters and Sportswriters Association. He received the honor in 1980, 1982, and 1985 for his work on WWL and WWL-TV then in 1986, 1988, and 1990 for his work on WGNO-TV.
