= J. J. Jennings =

American football player (born 1952)

Profile
- Positions: Fullback, tailback

Personal information
- Born: August 16, 1952 (age 74); Holyoke, Massachusetts, U.S.
- Listed height: 6 ft 1 in (1.85 m)
- Listed weight: 220 lb (100 kg)

Career information
- High school: Holyoke (MA)
- College: Rutgers
- NFL draft: 1974: 9th round, 222nd overall pick

Career history
- Memphis Southmen (1974); Philadelphia Bell (1975)

Awards and highlights
- All-WFL (1974); 2× First-team All-East (1972, 1973)

Career NFL statistics
- Games: 30 (WFL)
- Rushing yards: 1,869 (WFL)
- Points scored: 192 (WFL)

James Henry "J. J." Jennings (born August 16, 1952) is an American former professional football tailback and fullback.

Jennings was born in Holyoke, Massachusetts, in 1952. He attended Holyoke High School and played college football as a tailback for Rutgers from 1971 to 1973. During the 1973 season, he scored 20 touchdowns and two extra points and led the country in scoring. He totaled 2,935 rushing yards in three years at Rutgers, including 1,262 yards in 1972 and 1,353 yards in 1973.

He was drafted by the Kansas City Chiefs in the ninth round (222nd overall pick) of the 1974 NFL draft, but opted to play in the newly formed World Football League (WFL). In 1974, he appeared in 20 games for the Memphis Southmen and became the first WFL player to reach 1,000 rushing yards. He finished the 1974 season with 1,524 rushing yards on 322 carries, 431 receiving yards, on 46 catches, and 94 points scored. He was named to the official 1974 All-WFL team. His total of 1,524 rushing yards was second in the WFL during the 1974 season, 52 yards behind Florida's Tommy Reamon.

With Larry Csonka signing to play for Memphis in 1975, Jennings played the 1975 season with the Philadelphia Bell. He appeared in 10 games for the Bell, rushing for 345 yards on 82 carries.
