= 1974 World Football League season =

First of two seasons of the WFL

The 1974 World Football League season was the first season of the World Football League.

Twelve teams began the inaugural 1974 season, which launched July 10 and lasted 19 weeks with no bye week. The league doubled up the week of Labor Day by playing four games over the course of three weeks on a Wednesday, Monday (Labor Day), Friday, Wednesday schedule, giving the WFL teams 20 games each. Two teams, the Detroit Wheels and Jacksonville Sharks, dropped out and folded after fourteen weeks, with the New York Stars and Houston Texans relocating to other markets (Charlotte and Shreveport respectively) during the season. Portland and Detroit played a week 9 regular season game in London, Ontario, at Little Stadium.

The season culminated in World Bowl 1 on December 5, 1974, won by the Birmingham Americans.

== Teams ==
WFL teams: West, Central, East
* During the season, the New York Stars relocated to become the Charlotte Hornets (underlined), and the Houston Texans relocated to become the Shreveport Steamer (italics).

1974 World Football League
Division	Team	City	Arena	Capacity
East	Florida Blazers	Orlando, Florida	Florida Citrus Bowl	28,000
East	New York Stars; Charlotte Hornets	New York, New York; Charlotte, North Carolina	Downing Stadium; American Legion Memorial Stadium	22,000; 24,000
East	Jacksonville Sharks	Jacksonville, Florida	Gator Bowl Stadium	72,000
East	Philadelphia Bell	Philadelphia, Pennsylvania	John F. Kennedy Stadium	102,000
Central	Birmingham Americans	Birmingham, Alabama	Legion Field	68,821
Central	Chicago Fire	Chicago, Illinois	Soldier Field	55,701
Central	Detroit Wheels	Ypsilanti, Michigan	Rynearson Stadium	22,227
Central	Memphis Southmen	Memphis, Tennessee	Memphis Memorial Stadium	50,160
West	The Hawaiians	Honolulu, Hawaii	Honolulu Stadium	25,000
West	Houston Texans; Shreveport Steamer	Houston, Texas; Shreveport, Louisiana	Astrodome; State Fair Stadium	50,000; 50,000
West	Portland Storm	Portland, Oregon	Civic Stadium	25,218
West	Southern California Sun	Anaheim, California	Anaheim Stadium	43,202

== 1974 season ==
=== Final standings ===
W = Wins, L = Losses, T = Ties, PCT= Winning Percentage, PF = Points For, PA = Points Against

Eastern Division
Team	W	L	T	PCT	PF	PA
Florida Blazers	14	6	0	.700	416	280
Charlotte Hornets	10	10	0	.500	467	350
Philadelphia Bell	9	11	0	.450	493	413
Jacksonville Sharks	4	10	0	.286	258	357
Central Division
Team	W	L	T	PCT	PF	PA
Memphis Southmen	17	3	0	.850	629	365
Birmingham Americans	15	5	0	.750	500	394
Chicago Fire	7	13	0	.350	446	599
Detroit Wheels	1	13	0	.071	209	358
Western Division
Team	W	L	T	PCT	PF	PA
Southern California Sun	13	7	0	.650	485	441
The Hawaiians	9	11	0	.450	411	422
Portland Storm	7	12	1	.375	264	424
Shreveport Steamer	7	12	1	.375	240	415

Notes:
(a) Jacksonville and Detroit folded after 14 games; each week thereafter, the teams that had games scheduled against those teams played each other.
(b) Shreveport Steamer began the season as Houston Texans.
(c) Charlotte Hornets began season as New York Stars; upon announcing move to Charlotte, played one away game as Charlotte Stars, and remaining games as Hornets.
(d) Chicago forfeited its 20th game to Philadelphia, 2–0.

=== 1974 playoffs ===
The original WFL schedule had the three division champions plus one wild-card qualify, culminating in a "World Bowl" on the evening after Thanksgiving at the Gator Bowl in Jacksonville.

With financial problems mounting, various formats were bandied about:

- The playoffs would be scratched and the team with the best record would be declared champion.
- Three teams (Memphis, Birmingham, and Florida) would qualify for the playoffs, with West champ Southern California left out.
- The best eight of the remaining 10 teams would qualify.
- The top two teams in each division would qualify, seeded entirely by won-lost record.

Eventually, the playoffs were set with the opening rounds consisting of two teams from each division, with the two qualifying teams from the Central Division (Memphis and Birmingham), who ranked first and second in overall record, given byes to the next round. The Hawaiians faced Southern California in the West, but in the East, Florida instead faced Philadelphia, even though, at 9–11, the Bell were 1 game behind 10–10 Charlotte in the standings. However, when only 1,000 advance tickets were sold for the Blazers-Hornets matchup, league officials replaced the Hornets with the Bell. The Hornets were still reeling from their New York debts, and it was believed that the advance gate would not be nearly enough to justify the trip (reportedly, the players would have been lucky to get $100 for the game). The Bell, on the other hand, were on far stronger financial ground, and it was believed they could cover their own expenses.

==== Quarterfinals ====
Hawaiians defeated the Southern California Sun, 32–14 (at Anaheim, California, on Wednesday, November 20, 1974)

Florida Blazers defeated Philadelphia Bell, 18–3 (at Orlando, Florida, on Thursday, November 21, 1974)

==== Semifinals ====
Birmingham Americans defeated The Hawaiians, 22–19 (at Birmingham, Alabama, on Wednesday, November 27, 1974)

Florida Blazers defeated Memphis Southmen, 18–15 (at Memphis, Tennessee, on Friday, November 29, 1974)

==== World Bowl ====
Birmingham Americans 22, Florida Blazers 21 (at Birmingham, Alabama, on Thursday, December 5, 1974)

=== 1974 All-WFL Team ===
Offense
WR–Tim Delaney, Hawaiians (TSN, P&C)
WR–Alfred Jenkins, Birmingham Americans (TSN, P&C)
TE–Ed Marshall, Memphis Southmen (TSN)
TE–Greg Latta, Florida Blazers (P&C)
OT–Bob Wolfe, Birmingham Americans (TSN)
OT–Wally Highsmith, Memphis Southmen (P&C)
OT–Ron Mikolajczyk, Memphis Southmen (P&C)
OG–Rick Anthony, Florida Blazers P&C (P&C)
OG–Dave Bradley, Chicago Fire (TSN)
OG–Buddy Brown, Birmingham Americans (TSN, P&C)
C–Bob Kuziel, New York Stars/Charlotte Hornets (TSN)
C–Ralph Hill, Memphis Southmen (P&C)
QB–Tony Adams, Southern California Sun (TSN)
QB–Randy Johnson, Hawaiians (P&C)
RB–Tommy Reamon, Florida Blazers (TSN, P&C)
RB–J.J. Jennings, Memphis Southmen (TSN, P&C)
K–Grant Guthrie, Jacksonville Sharks/Birmingham Americans (TSN, P&C)

Defense
DE–Gerry Philbin, New York Stars/Charlotte Hornets (TSN, P&C)
DE–Louis Ross, Florida Blazers (TSN)
DE–John Ricca, Florida Blazers (P&C)
DT–Mike McBath, Florida Blazers (TSN, P&C)
DT–John Elliott, New York Stars/Charlotte Hornets (TSN)
DT–Dave Roller, Southern California Sun (TSN, P&C)
LB–Ross Brupbacher, Birmingham Americans (TSN, P&C)
LB–Rudy Kuechenberg, Chicago Fire (TSN, P&C)
LB–John Villapiano, Houston Texans/Shreveport (TSN, P&C)
CB–Miller Farr, Florida Blazers (TSN, P&C)
CB–Ron Mabra, Philadelphia Bell (TSN, P&C)
S–Dave Thomas, Memphis Southmen (TSN, P&C)
S–Jeff Woodcock, New York Stars/Charlotte Hornets (TSN, P&C)
P–Ken Clark, Portland Storm (TSN, P&C)

Head Coach: Jack Pardee, Florida Blazers (TSN, P&C)
Tri-MVPs: Tony Adams, Southern California, J.J. Jennings, Memphis, and Tommy Reamon, Florida.
Key: PC = voted on by players and coaches of the WFL; TSN = selection by The Sporting News

== See also ==
- 1975 World Football League season
