= Memphis Southmen =

Former American football team in the World Football League

Logo

General information
- Founded: 1974
- Folded: 1975
- Stadium: Liberty Bowl Memorial Stadium
- Headquartered: Memphis, Tennessee
- Colours: Burnt Orange and Brown

Personnel
- Owner: John F. Bassett
- General manager: Leo Cahill
- Head coach: John McVay

Nickname
- Grizzlies

League / conference affiliations
- World Football League: Central Division (1974); Eastern Division (1975)

The Memphis Southmen, also known as the Memphis Grizzlies, were an American football team based in Memphis, Tennessee. They played in the World Football League (WFL), which operated in 1974 and 1975. They played their home games at Liberty Bowl Memorial Stadium.

== From North to South ==
The team was originally slated to be based in Toronto, Canada, with the nickname of the Northmen. However, when Canadian Prime Minister Pierre Trudeau announced that no U.S.-based professional football league would be allowed in Canada in competition with the Canadian Football League under the Canadian Football Act, a change in venue and nickname was announced. From the beginning, Memphians disliked "Southmen" and the team was informally known as the Memphis Grizzlies. The name appeared to come from the logo, a representation of a bear backed by the sun.

The "Grizzlies" were owned by John F. Bassett. A multi-millionaire, Bassett gave the league instant credibility by signing three stars from the National Football League's Miami Dolphins for the 1975 season: running backs Larry Csonka and Jim Kiick, and wide receiver Paul Warfield. A Grizzlies quarterback was Danny White, who later became a quarterback and punter with the Dallas Cowboys from 1976 to 1988. John McVay was introduced as the head coach of the Grizzlies before the 1974 season. After his tenure with the Grizzlies, McVay would later serve as Vice-President and General Manager of the San Francisco 49ers for nineteen years, from 1980 to 1999. During this period, McVay presided over five Super Bowl-winning seasons and was named NFL Executive of the Year in 1989.

The Southmen's home opener against the Detroit Wheels drew 30,122 fans, including Elvis Presley, a professed football fanatic. Country superstar Charlie Rich sang the national anthem. After Rich took his seat next to Elvis afterward, Presley commented, "That's a tough song to sing, ain't it?" Rich replied, "It ain't no 'Behind Closed Doors'."

Even before the Miami Trio arrived, the 1974 Southmen found two durable running backs in J. J. Jennings and John Harvey, and they finished with the league's best record at 17–3. They lost in the semifinals to the Orlando-based Florida Blazers, 18–15.

In 1975, Larry Csonka, Jim Kiick, and Paul Warfield finally came to Memphis (now officially dubbed the Grizzlies), but even they couldn't save the league, which folded during the middle of its second season. The 1975 Grizzlies finished 7–4; in their last WFL game, they were shut out by the Birmingham Vulcans, 21–0.

Memphis eventually not only received another professional sports team via a relocation from Canada, but one that was officially called the Grizzlies – the Vancouver Grizzlies of the National Basketball Association would move to Memphis in 2001. The NBA Grizzlies are the only major professional sports team to keep its nickname after moving from Canada to the United States.

In 2004, Mississippi's Johnny Wofford produced a DVD honouring the 1974–75 Southmen/Grizzlies. It included pictures from the 2004 30-year reunion conference.

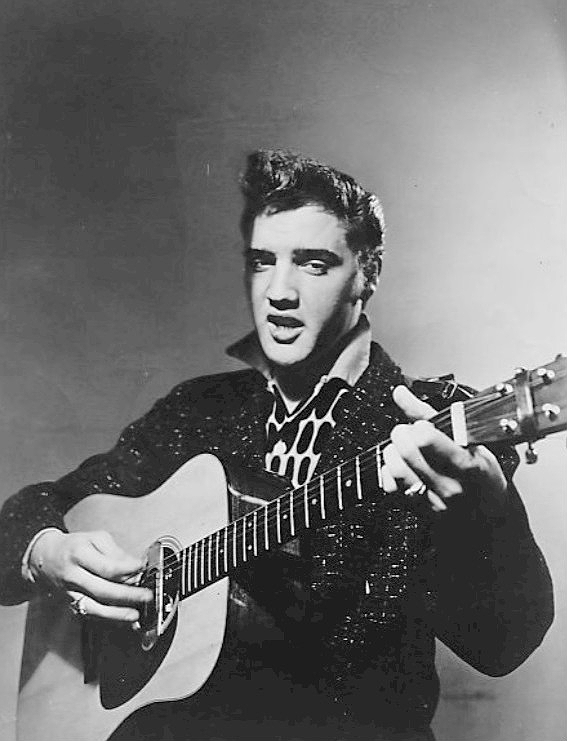
The Grizzlies were supported by a large local fan base that included Memphis-resident Elvis Presley

== Memphis and the NFL ==
The Southmen were one of the stronger and better-supported WFL franchises. With the wealth of Bassett, by far the richest owner in the WFL, behind them, the Southmen would have almost certainly been a viable venture had the WFL's overall management been more financially sound. After the WFL folded, Bassett applied for membership in the NFL as an expansion team. Over 40,000 deposits for season tickets were collected in this effort, which included a December 1975 telethon dubbed the "NFL-a-Thon" on Memphis television station WMC-TV Channel 5. To their dismay, the NFL refused to accept the team. McVay and many of the Southmen moved on to join the New York Giants, where in what has been described as "the closest approximation to a meeting between the champions of the WFL and the NFL", the Southmen reinforcements helped the Giants defeat the defending Super Bowl champion Pittsburgh Steelers 17–0 in a 1976 preseason matchup.

Still, there were fans who would not quit. A lawsuit, Mid-South Grizzlies v. NFL, tried to force the league to accept the Grizzlies. It was not settled until 1984, by which time Bassett owned the Tampa Bay Bandits of the United States Football League and the case was rendered moot.

Long after Presley's death in 1977, his estate was involved in an attempt to bring the NFL to Memphis; the Memphis Hound Dogs proposal ultimately lost (professional football would eventually come to the city in 1995 in the form of the Canadian Football League's Mad Dogs, which Presley's estate had no involvement with; the team folded after that single season).

The NFL's Tennessee Oilers (newly relocated from Houston) played their 1997 season in Memphis before making their permanent home in Nashville.

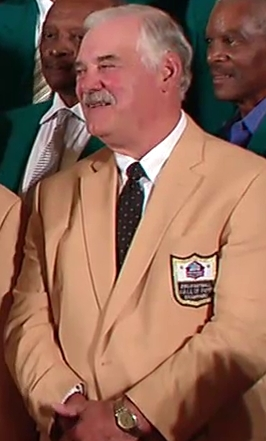
Former Grizzlies RB Larry Csonka (shown in 2013) was inducted into the Pro Football Hall of Fame in 1987

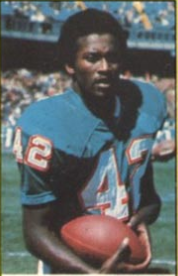
Former Grizzlies WR Paul Warfield was inducted into the NFL's Hall of Fame in 1983

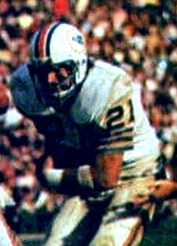
Jim Kiick was a AFL All-Star RB prior to joining the Grizzlies

== Schedule and results ==
Key:	Win	Loss	Bye

=== 1974 regular season ===
Week	Day	Date	Opponent	Result	Attendance
1	Wednesday	July 10, 1974	Detroit Wheels	W 34–15	30,122
2	Thursday	July 18, 1974	Portland Storm	W 16–8	31,088
3	Wednesday	July 24, 1974	at Birmingham Americans	L 33–58	61,319
4	Thursday	August 1, 1974	Southern California Sun	W 25–15	25,175
5	Wednesday	August 7, 1974	at Philadelphia Bell	L 15–46	12,396
6	Wednesday	August 14, 1974	at Detroit Wheels	W 37–7	14,424
7	Wednesday	August 21, 1974	Hawaiians	W 60–8	25,123
8	Wednesday	August 28, 1974	at Florida Blazers	W 26–18	15,746
9	Monday	September 2, 1974	at Jacksonville Sharks	W 16–13	22,169
10	Saturday	September 7, 1974	Houston Texans	W 45–0	15,291
11	Wednesday	September 11, 1974	Birmingham Americans	W 46–7	30,675
12	Wednesday	September 18, 1974	at Chicago Fire	W 25–7	26,678
13	Wednesday	September 25, 1974	at Shreveport Steamer	W 17–3	21,357
14	Wednesday	October 2, 1974	Jacksonville Sharks	W 47–19	15,016
15	Wednesday	October 9, 1974	at Charlotte Hornets	W 27–23	25,133
16	Wednesday	October 16, 1974	Florida Blazers	W 25–15	15,334
17	Thursday	October 24, 1974	at Portland Storm	L 25–26	13,228
18	Wednesday	October 30, 1974	at Hawaiians	W 33–31	20,544
19	Thursday	November 7, 1974	Chicago Fire	W 49–24	14,085
20	Wednesday	November 13, 1974	Charlotte Hornets	W 28–22	13,339

=== Playoffs ===
Game	Day	Date	Opponent	Result	Attendance
Quarterfinals	BYE				
Semifinals	Friday	November 29, 1974	Florida Blazers	L 15–18	9,692

=== 1975 regular season ===
Week	Day	Date	Opponent	Result	Venue	Attendance	Source
1	Sunday	August 2, 1975	Jacksonville Express	W 27–26	Memphis Memorial Stadium	25,166	
2	Sunday	August 9, 1975	Charlotte Hornets	W 23–11	Memphis Memorial Stadium	19,729	
3	Sunday	August 23, 1975	at Philadelphia Bell	L 18–22	Franklin Field	5,051	
4	Sunday	August 30, 1975	Chicago Winds	W 31–7	Memphis Memorial Stadium	21,515	
5	Sunday	September 7, 1975	Hawaiians	W 37–17	Memphis Memorial Stadium	15,132	
6	Sunday	September 14, 1975	Shreveport Steamer	W 34–23	Memphis Memorial Stadium	18,003	
7	Sunday	September 21, 1975	at Portland Thunder	W 16–3	Civic Stadium	14,818	
8	Sunday	September 28, 1975	at San Antonio Wings	L 17–25	Alamo Stadium	16,283	
9	Sunday	October 5, 1975	Southern California Sun	W 37–33	Memphis Memorial Stadium	18,129	
10	Sunday	October 12, 1975	Birmingham Vulcans	L 14–18	Memphis Memorial Stadium	20,192	
11	Sunday	October 19, 1975	at Birmingham Vulcans	L 0–21	Legion Field	35,000	

== See also ==
- 1974 World Football League season
- 1975 World Football League season
