= Shreveport Steamer =

American football team

Houston Texans

General information
- Founded: 1974
- Folded: September 18, 1974
- Stadium: Astrodome
- Headquartered: Houston, Texas, U.S.
- Colors: Green and gold

Personnel
- Head coach: Marshall Taylor

League / conference affiliations
- World Football League; Western Division

Shreveport Steamer

General information
- Founded: September 1974
- Folded: October 1975
- Stadium: State Fair Stadium
- Headquartered: Shreveport, Louisiana
- Colors: Green and gold

Personnel
- Head coach: Jim Garrett

Nickname
- The Boats

League / conference affiliations
- World Football League; Western Division

The Shreveport Steamer were a professional American football team in the World Football League. The franchise began the 1974 season in Houston, Texas, as the Houston Texans (no connection to the current NFL team of the same name), playing their home games at the Houston Astrodome. Toward the end of the season, the team relocated to Shreveport, Louisiana, and became the Shreveport Steamer. They played at the 30,000-seat State Fair Stadium, now named Independence Stadium. Larry King, of future CNN fame, was one of their broadcasters.

The Steamer showcased a number of veterans and a few rookies. Among them were ambidextrous quarterback and former University of Houston star D. C. Nobles and several American Football League veterans: quarterbacks Mike Taliaferro and Don Trull, fullback Jim Nance, wide receivers Don Maynard and Rick Eber, tight end Willie Frazier, former Houston Oiler and All-AFL tackle Glen Ray Hines, linebacker Garland Boyette, defensive end Al Dotson, defensive backs Daryl Johnson, Richmond Flowers Jr., John Mallory, and Art McMahon, and rookie linebacker John Villapiano, brother of Oakland Raiders defender Phil Villapiano.

== History ==
=== 1974 season ===
The Texans played in Houston for 11 games, going 3–7–1. The team relocated to Shreveport on September 18, 1974. On September 23, 1974, they were rechristened the Shreveport Steamer. The franchise, according to the WFL, was operated on a "play now, pay later" basis. The team was coached by Marshall Taylor, a former star player at Tennessee Tech. The Steamer made their home debut on September 25 against the Memphis Southmen. They played in front of just over 21,000 fans, and lost 17–3. They had a 4–5 record after the move, finishing 7–12–1 overall in 1974.

In 1974, under federal court order, Sheriff James M. Goslin seized equipment of the Charlotte Hornets, who were in Shreveport playing at Independence Stadium for the WFL against the Shreveport Steamer. Goslin was complying with a suit seeking more than $26,000 in accumulated debts that had been filed against the Hornets by plaintiffs in New York, where the team had been domiciled during the first half of 1974. However, Goslin allowed the Hornets to play the Steamer before the impounding of the equipment.

=== 1975 season ===
The Steamer returned for the 1975 WFL season with a different coaching staff. Right from the start, both the "Boats" and the resurrected league struggled. (The second Chicago franchise, the Chicago Winds, unrelated except by venue to the previous year's Chicago team, the Chicago Fire, ceased operations on September 2, after five games.) After a mediocre 5–7 record and with the franchise almost out of money, the Steamer and the WFL sank permanently on October 22, 1975. The second WFL ceased operations little more than halfway through the planned 1975 season.

An unrelated "Shreveport Steamer", also known as the plural "Steamers", played in the American Football Association from 1979 to 1981. (All copyrights and trademarks for the WFL's teams were allowed to lapse after the league's shutdown.) This team renamed itself the "Steamers-Americans" after merging with the Orlando Americans in 1982. Billy Kilmer served as the team's coach in its first season.

== Schedule and results ==
Key:	Win	Loss	Bye

=== 1974 regular season ===
Week	Day	Date	Opponent	Result	Venue	Attendance	Source
1	Wednesday	July 10, 1974	at Chicago Fire	L 0–17	Soldier Field	42,000	
2	Wednesday	July 17, 1974	Philadelphia Bell	W 11–0	Houston Astrodome	26,227	
3	Wednesday	July 24, 1974	at Florida Blazers	L 3–15	Florida Citrus Bowl	15,729	
4	Wednesday	July 31, 1974	Florida Blazers	W 7–6	Houston Astrodome	16,268	
5	Wednesday	August 7, 1974	at Portland Storm	T 15–15	Civic Stadium	15,686	
6	Thursday	August 15, 1974	Southern California Sun	L 7–18	Houston Astrodome	31,227	
7	Wednesday	August 21, 1974	at New York Stars	L 10–43	Downing Stadium	12,042	
8	Wednesday	August 28, 1974	New York Stars	W 14–11	Houston Astrodome	10,126	
9	Sunday	September 1, 1974	at Hawaiians	L 15–33	Honolulu Stadium	10,248	
10	Saturday	September 7, 1974	at Memphis Southmen	L 0–45	Memphis Memorial Stadium	15,291	
11	Wednesday	September 11, 1974	Hawaiians	L 17–24	Houston Astrodome	9,061	
12	Thursday	September 19, 1974^{†}	at Birmingham Americans	L 14–42	Legion Field	33,619	
13	Wednesday	September 25, 1974^{‡}	Memphis Southmen	L 3–17	State Fair Stadium	21,357	
14	Wednesday	October 2, 1974	Detroit Wheels	W 14–11	State Fair Stadium	22,012	
15	Thursday	October 10, 1974	at Southern California Sun	L 23–25	Anaheim Stadium	24,223	
16	Wednesday	October 16, 1974	at Philadelphia Bell	W 30–25	John F. Kennedy Stadium	750	
17	Wednesday	October 23, 1974	Birmingham Americans	W 31–0	State Fair Stadium	24,617	
18	Thursday	October 31, 1974	Portland Storm	L 0–14	State Fair Stadium	20,402	
19	Wednesday	November 6, 1974	Charlotte Hornets	W 19–14	State Fair Stadium	10,697	
20	Wednesday	November 13, 1974	at Birmingham Americans	L 7–40	Legion Field	14,794	

† first game after announcing move to Shreveport
‡ first home game in Shreveport

=== 1975 regular season ===
Week	Day	Date	Opponent	Result	Venue	Attendance	Source
1	Sunday	August 2, 1975	at San Antonio Wings	L 3–19	Alamo Stadium	10,411	
2	Sunday	August 9, 1975	Chicago Winds	W 38–18	State Fair Stadium	10,611	
3	Sunday	August 16, 1975	Philadelphia Bell	W 10–3	State Fair Stadium	12,016	
4	Sunday	August 23, 1975	at Portland Thunder	L 24–33	Civic Stadium	6,576	
5	Sunday	August 30, 1975	at Birmingham Vulcans	L 8–21	Legion Field	18,700	
6	Saturday	September 6, 1975	Jacksonville Express	L 15–22	State Fair Stadium	13,638	
7	Sunday	September 14, 1975	at Memphis Grizzlies	L 23–34	Memphis Memorial Stadium	18,003	
8	Saturday	September 20, 1975	Southern California Sun	W 38–29	State Fair Stadium	18,777	
9	Sunday	September 28, 1975	Hawaiians	W 32–25	State Fair Stadium	21,349	
10	Sunday	October 5, 1975	Charlotte Hornets	L 14–39	State Fair Stadium	20,407	
11	Sunday	October 12, 1975	at Southern California Sun	L 30–39	Anaheim Stadium	10,505	
12	Sunday	October 19, 1975	San Antonio Wings	W 41–31	State Fair Stadium	8,500	

== See also ==
- 1974 World Football League season
- 1975 World Football League season

== Sources ==
- Houston Texans 1974 WFL Media Guide
- Shreveport Steamer 1975 WFL Media Guide
