= Portland Thunder (WFL) =

American football team

Portland Storm (1974) Portland Thunder (1975)
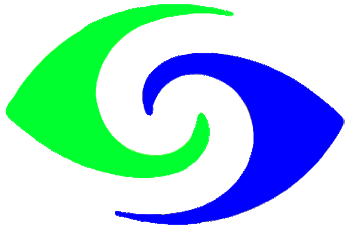
Helmet
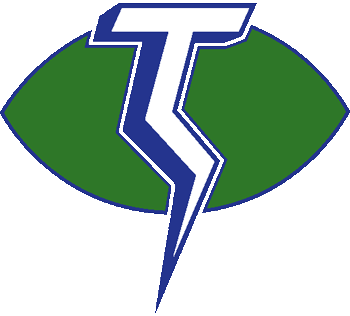
Logo

General information
- Founded: October 1973
- Folded: October 1975
- Stadium: Civic Stadium
- Headquartered: Portland, Oregon
- Colours: Storm: Lime Green and Royal Blue Thunder: Forest Green and Royal Blue

Personnel
- Owners: Robert Harris and Bruce Gelker
- General manager: Ron Mix
- Head coach: Dick Coury

League / conference affiliations
- World Football League; Western Division

The Portland Thunder (originally Portland Storm) was an American football team in the World Football League based out of Portland, Oregon. When the World Football League was created in October 1973, the Storm was the original New York franchise. When the Boston Bulls merged with New York to become the New York Stars, the original New York entry's draft picks were eventually relocated to Portland. They were the first major league football team based in Portland. They played at then Civic Stadium, now known as Providence Park.

Portland's original owner, Houston accountant John Rooney, soon dropped out of the picture. By March 1974, Bruce Gelker, a former football player and owner of several Saddleback Inns, was named the new owner of the fledgling team. Gelker originally sought a team in Mexico City, which proved to be unfeasible. After approaching officials in Salt Lake City, he settled on Portland. The Storm hired Ron Mix, a Pro Football Hall of Famer, as general manager and Dick Coury, an NFL assistant with the Denver Broncos, as head coach. Before the season, Canadian businessman Robert Harris bought a controlling interest, but Gelker stayed on as team president.

The Storm was the last WFL team to be organized, and as a result had mostly rookies on their roster. Among the standouts was running back Rufus "Roadrunner" Ferguson, ex-CFL and Detroit Lion quarterback Greg Barton, and linebackers coach Marty Schottenheimer (later a successful head coach in the NFL) and Bruce Bergey, brother of Cincinnati Bengals-Philadelphia Eagles linebacker Bill Bergey.

In the first half of the season Portland played poorly, going 2-7-1. The Storm won their first game when they beat Detroit in the ninth week. Originally a Wheels home game, the contest was moved to London, Ontario. The team improved during the second half of the season, thanks in part to several NFL players cut during training camp that September. Among the new signings were Ben Davidson of the Oakland Raiders, and Pete Beathard, who had been cut by the Kansas City Chiefs. With the stock of veterans, the Storm won six of their final 10 games. One of those wins was a 26–21 upset of the powerful Birmingham Americans.

The team was in trouble off the field as well. They only drew 14,000 fans per game. Additionally, an onerous lease with Civic Stadium rapidly drained the team of cash. By the middle of the season, Harris was so short on cash that he persuaded the Detroit Wheels to move their game to his hometown of London, Ontario. The players went the last few games without being paid, and reportedly they had to depend on sympathetic fans for food. They were forced to move their final home game, against the Florida Blazers, to the road due to the poor attendance, and only played after Harris guaranteed them $50,000. The money never arrived.

The team finished the season with an overall record of 7-12-1, tied with Houston-Shreveport for 8th place in the 12-team league and seemingly qualifying them for the playoffs. However, league officials decided to reduce the playoff field to six teams—without telling anyone with the Storm. Soon after, the IRS slapped a $168,000 lien on the franchise.

The Portland Thunder took the Storm's place in 1975 and lasted until the entire WFL folded halfway through their second season. The Thunder's office in downtown closed in October 1975.

In 2013, the Arena Football League expanded into Portland. The new franchise was named the Portland Thunder, making many recall the Storm/Thunder.

== Schedule and results ==
Key:	Win	Loss	Bye

=== 1974 regular season ===
Week	Day	Date	Opponent	Result	Attendance
1	Wednesday	July 10, 1974	at Philadelphia Bell	L 8–33	55,534
2	Thursday	July 18, 1974	at Memphis Southmen	L 8–16	31,088
3	Wednesday	July 24, 1974	Chicago Fire	L 22–29	19,358
4	Wednesday	July 31, 1974	Philadelphia Bell	L 7–25	13,757
5	Wednesday	August 7, 1974	Houston Texans	T 15–15	15,636
6	Wednesday	August 14, 1974	at New York Stars	L 16–38	16,222
7	Wednesday	August 21, 1974	at Florida Blazers	L 7–11	15,541
8	Wednesday	August 28, 1974	at Southern California Sun	L 15–45	27,814
9	Monday	September 2, 1974	at Detroit Wheels (at London, Ontario)	W 18–7	5,101
10	Friday	September 6, 1974	Hawaiians	W 15–6	15,551
11	Wednesday	September 11, 1974	New York Stars	L 15–34	13,339
12	Wednesday	September 18, 1974	at Jacksonville Sharks	W 19–17	16,041
13	Wednesday	September 25, 1974	Birmingham Americans	W 26–21	14,273
14	Wednesday	October 2, 1974	Southern California Sun	L 22–26	20,469
15	Wednesday	October 9, 1974	at Birmingham Americans	L 8–30	25,621
16	Wednesday	October 16, 1974	Hawaiians	W 3–0	11,302
17	Thursday	October 24, 1974	Memphis Southmen	W 26–25	13,228
18	Thursday	October 31, 1974	at Shreveport Steamer	W 14–0	20,402
19	Thursday	November 7, 1974	at Florida Blazers	L 0–23	11,676
20	Wednesday	November 13, 1974	at Hawaiians	L 0–23	14,245

=== 1975 regular season ===
Week	Day	Date	Opponent	Result	Venue	Attendance	Source
1	Monday	August 3, 1975	at Southern California Sun	L 15–21	Anaheim Stadium	14,362	
2	Sunday	August 9, 1975	Hawaiians	L 24–25	Civic Stadium	7,709	
3	Sunday	August 16, 1975	at Chicago Winds	L 18–25 ^{OT}	Soldier Field	3,470	
4	Sunday	August 23, 1975	Shreveport Steamer	W 33–24	Civic Stadium	6,576	
5	Sunday	August 30, 1975	at San Antonio Wings	L 0–22	Alamo Stadium	12,197	
6	Saturday	September 6, 1975	Birmingham Vulcans	L 8–26	Civic Stadium	6,342	
7	Saturday	September 13, 1975	at Philadelphia Bell	W 25–10	Franklin Field	4,710	
8	Sunday	September 21, 1975	Memphis Grizzlies	L 3–16	Civic Stadium	14,818	
9	Saturday	October 4, 1975	at Jacksonville Express	L 29–32	Gator Bowl Stadium	8,119	
10	Sunday	October 12, 1975	San Antonio Wings	W 28–25 ^{OT}	Civic Stadium	3,818	
11	Sunday	October 19, 1975	Jacksonville Express	W 30–13	Civic Stadium	8,713	

== See also ==
- 1974 World Football League season
- 1975 World Football League season
- Portland Breakers
