= Ron Mabra =

American football player (1951–2017)

No. 29, 27
- Position: Defensive back

Personal information
- Born: June 4, 1951; Talladega, Alabama, U.S.
- Died: November 10, 2017 (aged 66); Atlanta, Georgia, U.S.
- Listed height: 5 ft 10 in (1.78 m)
- Listed weight: 166 lb (75 kg)

Career information
- High school: Westside (AL)
- College: Howard
- NFL draft: 1973: undrafted

Career history
- Kansas City Chiefs (1973)*; Philadelphia Bell (1974); Atlanta Falcons (1975–1976); New York Jets (1978); Winnipeg Blue Bombers (1979)
- * Offseason or practice squad member only
- Stats at Pro Football Reference

Ronald Edwin Mabra (June 4, 1951 – November 10, 2017) was an American football defensive back who played for the Philadelphia Bell in 1974, the Atlanta Falcons 1975–1976, the New York Jets in 1978, and the Winnipeg Blue Bombers in 1979.

== Career ==
Year	Team	Number	Pos	Games	INTs
1974	Philadelphia Bell	N/A	DB		9
1975	Atlanta Falcons	29	DB	8
1976	Atlanta Falcons	29	DB	8
1978	New York Jets	27	DB	3
1979	Winnipeg Blue Bombers		DB
