= The Hawaiians (WFL) =

Football team in the World Football League from 1974 to 1975

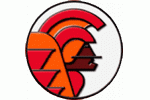
Logo

General information
- Founded: 1974
- Folded: October 1975
- Stadium: Honolulu Stadium (1974); Aloha Stadium (1975)
- Headquartered: Honolulu, Hawaii
- Colours: Brown, Gold, Scarlet

Personnel
- Owners: Christopher Hemmeter and Sam Battisone (1974); Edward Sultan, Jr. (1975)
- General manager: Danny Rodgers
- Head coach: Mike Giddings

League / conference affiliations
- World Football League; Western Division

The Hawaiians were a professional American football team based in Honolulu that played in the World Football League (WFL) for two seasons, 1974 and 1975. Their records were 9–11 in 1974 and 4–7–1 in 1975. Their home stadium was Honolulu Stadium in 1974 and Aloha Stadium in 1975. The best known player to play for the Hawaiians was former Dallas Cowboys running back Calvin Hill, though quarterback Jim Fassel became better known as a head coach decades later. The Hawaiians' head coach was Michael Giddings who guided the Hawaiians through both the 1974 and 1975 World Football League seasons.

The franchise was originally going to be called the Honolulu Warriors, but a local team had trademarked that name. As a result, the team was known simply as "The Hawaiians", although the press frequently mistakenly called them the "Honolulu Hawaiians" or the "Hawaii Hawaiians." They were owned by real estate developer Christopher Hemmeter for the first season. He was named league president in 1975, and sold the Hawaiians to jewel merchant Edward Sultan Jr.

Though lasting for less than two seasons of play, the Hawaiians represented a serious attempt to form a viable professional football organization, one that at least had the potential for success had the WFL been better run. They were one of only three teams that did not miss a payroll during the league's first season. (False accounts had said some players released from the team could not afford to get to the mainland.) Hemmeter and his original partner, Sam Battisone (who also owned the NBA's New Orleans Jazz) were among the few owners thought to be capable of fielding a team in 1975.

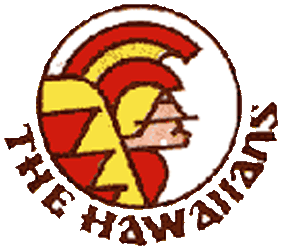
Original The Hawaiians logo used in 1974 with a script.

It was the first and, to date, only major professional American football team to establish its home base outside the contiguous 48 states.

== Schedule and results ==
Key:	Win	Loss	Bye

=== 1974 regular season ===
Week	Day	Date	Opponent	Result	Venue	Attendance	Source
1	Wednesday	July 10, 1974	at Florida Blazers	L 7–8	Florida Citrus Bowl	18,625	
2	Wednesday	July 17, 1974	at Southern California Sun	L 31–38	Anaheim Stadium	32,088	
3	Sunday	July 21, 1974	Detroit Wheels	W 36–16	Honolulu Stadium	10,080	
4	Sunday	July 28, 1974	Chicago Fire	L 29–53	Honolulu Stadium	12,608	
5	Thursday	August 8, 1974	at Jacksonville Sharks	L 14–21	Gator Bowl Stadium	43,869	
6	Wednesday	August 14, 1974	at Birmingham Americans	L 0–39	Legion Field	43,297	
7	Wednesday	August 21, 1974	at Memphis Southmen	L 8–60	Memphis Memorial Stadium	25,123	
8	Sunday	August 25, 1974	Jacksonville Sharks	L 8–14	Honolulu Stadium	10,099	
9	Sunday	September 1, 1974	Houston Texans	W 33–15	Honolulu Stadium	10,248	
10	Friday	September 6, 1974	at Portland Storm	L 6–15	Civic Stadium	15,551	
11	Wednesday	September 11, 1974	at Houston Texans	W 24–17	Houston Astrodome	9,061	
12	Wednesday	September 18, 1974	New York Stars	W 17–14	Honolulu Stadium	12,169	
13	Wednesday	September 25, 1974	Philadelphia Bell	L 16–21	Honolulu Stadium	14,493	
14	Wednesday	October 2, 1974	Birmingham Americans	W 14–8	Honolulu Stadium	12,039	
15	Wednesday	October 9, 1974	at Philadelphia Bell	W 25–22	John F. Kennedy Stadium	4,900	
16	Wednesday	October 16, 1974	at Portland Storm	L 0–3	Civic Stadium	11,302	
17	Wednesday	October 23, 1974	at Chicago Fire	W 60–17	Soldier Field	20,203	
18	Wednesday	October 30, 1974	Memphis Southmen	L 31–33	Honolulu Stadium	20,544	
19	Wednesday	November 6, 1974	Southern California Sun	W 29–8	Honolulu Stadium	13,780	
20	Wednesday	November 13, 1974	Portland Storm	W 23–0	Honolulu Stadium	14,245	

=== Playoffs ===
Game	Day	Date	Opponent	Result	Venue	Attendance	Source
Quarterfinals	Thursday	November 21, 1974	at Southern California Sun	W 32–14	Anaheim Stadium	11,430	
Semifinals	Wednesday	November 27, 1974	at Birmingham Americans	L 19–22	Legion Field	15,379	

=== 1975 regular season ===
Week	Day	Date	Opponent	Result	Venue	Attendance	Source
1	Sunday	August 2, 1975	at Philadelphia Bell	L 15–21	Franklin Field	3,266	
2	Sunday	August 9, 1975	at Portland Thunder	W 25–24	Civic Stadium	7,709	
3	Sunday	August 16, 1975	Southern California Sun	L 19–37	Honolulu Stadium	15,862	
4	Sunday	August 23, 1975	Chicago Winds	W 28–17	Honolulu Stadium	10,313	
5	Sunday	September 7, 1975	at Memphis Grizzlies	L 17–37	Memphis Memorial Stadium	15,132	
6	Sunday	September 14, 1975	Jacksonville Express	W 33–15	Aloha Stadium	18,479	
7	Sunday	September 21, 1975	at San Antonio Wings	L 11–30	Alamo Stadium	10,871	
8	Sunday	September 28, 1975	at Shreveport Steamer	L 25–32	State Fair Stadium	21,349	
9	Saturday	October 4, 1975	Birmingham Vulcans	L 16–29	Aloha Stadium	18,894	
10	Saturday	October 11, 1975	Philadelphia Bell	W 14–13	Aloha Stadium	10,789	
11	Sunday	October 19, 1975	Southern California Sun	L 7–26	Aloha Stadium	15,905	

== See also ==
- 1974 World Football League season
- 1975 World Football League season
