= Terry Henley =

American football player

Profile
- Position: Running back

Personal information
- Born: Oxford, Alabama

Career information
- College: Auburn
- NFL draft: 1972: undrafted

Career history
- Atlanta Falcons (1973)*; Birmingham Americans (1974)*; Washington Redskins (1974)*; New England Patriots (1975)*
- * Offseason or practice squad member only

Awards and highlights
- First-team All-SEC (1972)

Terry Henley is an American former football player. Henley played college football for the Auburn Tigers and was named first-team All-SEC in 1972. He was signed as a free agent by the Atlanta Falcons in 1973 but was cut during training camp. Henley signed to play for the Birmingham Americans of the World Football League in 1974 but was cut from the team just before the season began. The Washington Redskins invited Henley to their training camp in August 1974 but he failed to make the team. In February 1975, Henley signed on to the New England Patriots as a free agent but was cut from the roster before the start of the regular season. Henley announced in 1976 that he would no longer pursue a career in professional football and turned to Birmingham, Alabama, to sell insurance.

Henley was inducted into the Alabama Sports Hall of Fame in the Class of 2000. He was inducted into the Calhoun County Sports Hall of Fame in 2006. Henley was also elected to the Auburn Tigers football "1970s Team of the Decade".
