= Program book =

Literature produced for a conference

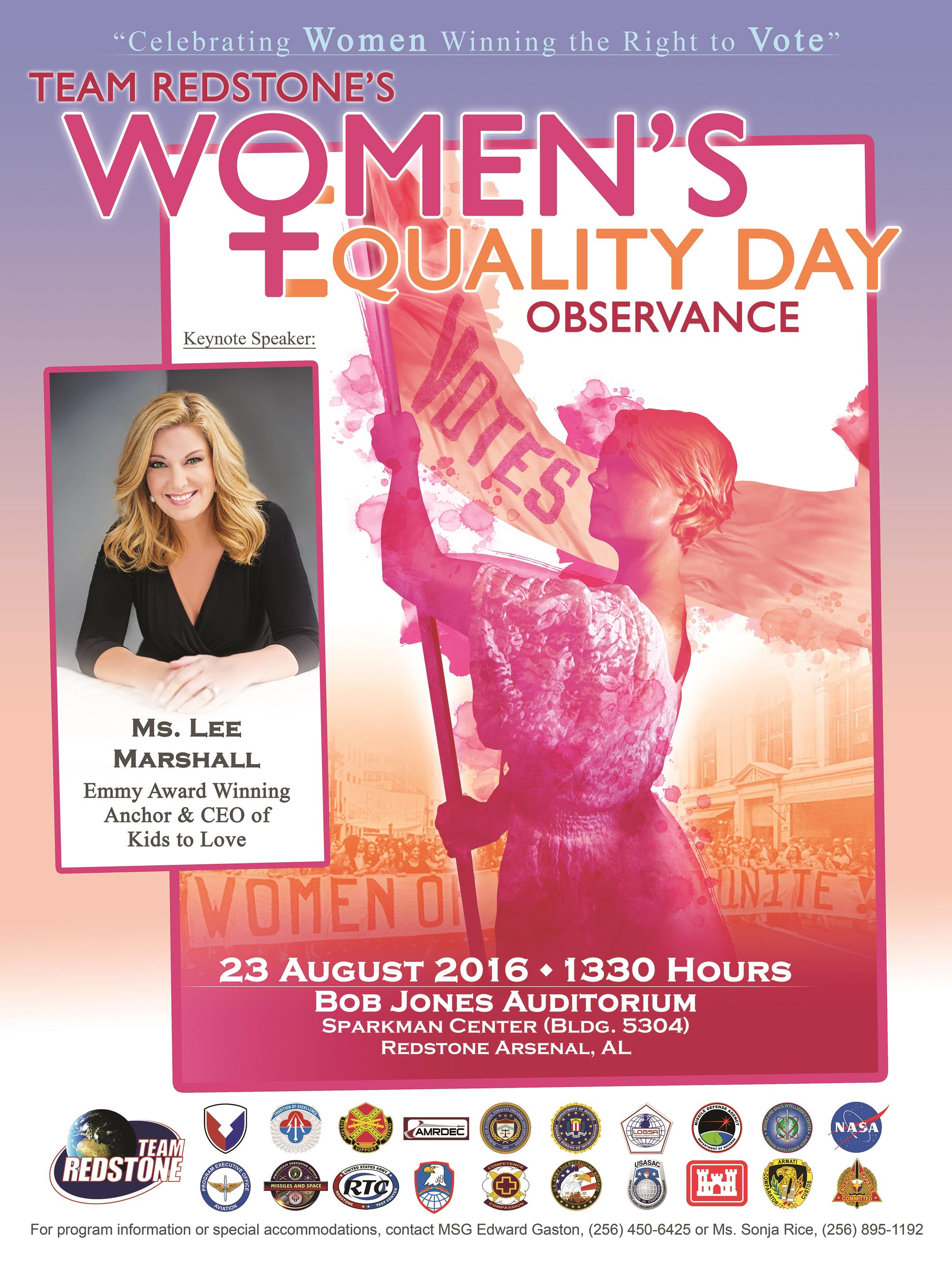
Program book for Women's Equality Day, Aug. 23, 2016

A program book is a printed schedule of meeting events, locations of function rooms, location of exhibitors, and other pertinent information pertaining to a convention or conference. It is customary in many cases to sell advertising in program books to cover part of the costs of operation.

== Usage ==
Program books are used at events where the use of a phone would be disruptive, where the attendee base is an older demographic that are less likely to use a phone or app, or when the event map is unintuitive or the event spans multiple days or venues.
