= George Mira =

American football player (1942–2025)

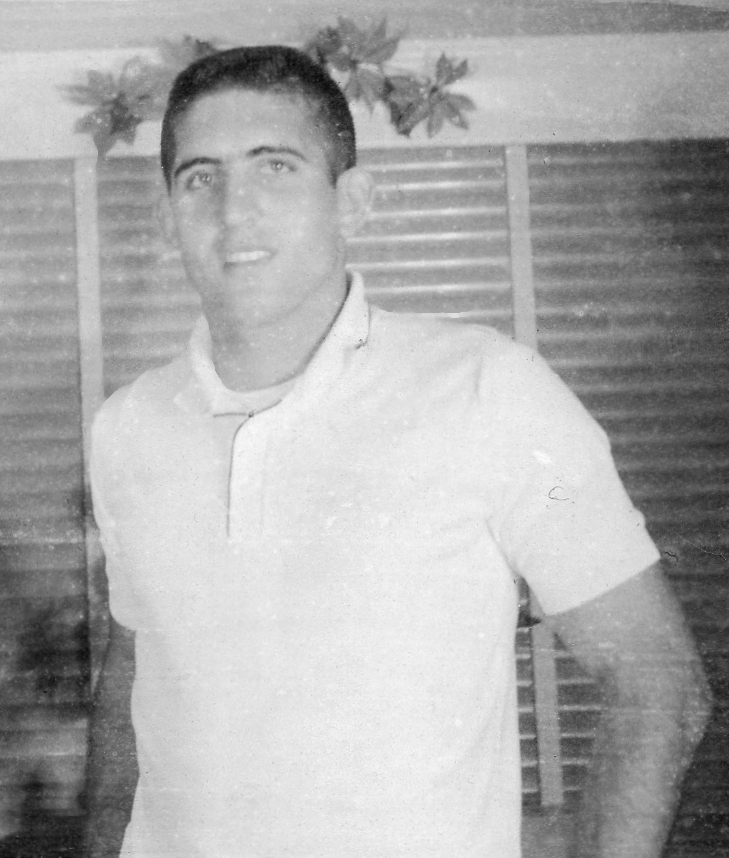
- Mira c. 1962

No. 10
- Position: Quarterback

Personal information
- Born: January 11, 1942; Key West, Florida, U.S.
- Died: December 9, 2025 (aged 83); Miami, Florida, U.S.
- Listed height: 6 ft 0 in (1.83 m)
- Listed weight: 190 lb (86 kg)

Career information
- High school: Key West
- College: Miami (FL) (1960–1963)
- NFL draft: 1964: 2nd round, 15th overall pick
- AFL draft: 1964: 18th round, 137th overall pick

Career history
- San Francisco 49ers (1964–1968); Philadelphia Eagles (1969); Baltimore Colts (1970)*; Miami Dolphins (1971); Montreal Alouettes (1972–1973); Birmingham Americans (1974); Jacksonville Express (1975); Toronto Argonauts (1977)
- * Offseason or practice squad member only

Awards and highlights
- Super Bowl champion (V); First-team All-American (1962); Second-team All-American (1963); Miami Hurricanes No. 10 retired

Career NFL statistics
- Passing attempts: 346
- Passing completions: 148
- Completion percentage: 42.8%
- TD–INT: 19–20
- Passing yards: 2,110
- Passer rating: 57.4
- Rushing yards: 379
- Stats at Pro Football Reference

Career CFL statistics
- Passing attempts: 327
- Passing completions: 157
- Completion percentage: 48%
- TD–INT: 19–23
- Passing yards: 2,291

George Ignacio Mira (January 11, 1942 – December 9, 2025) was an American professional football player who was a quarterback for eight seasons in the National Football League (NFL) with four teams. He then played five seasons in the Canadian Football League (CFL) and the World Football League (WFL). He played college football for the Miami Hurricanes.

== Early life ==
George Ignacio Mira was born in Key West, Florida, on January 11, 1942. He was born to Jimmy Mira Sr. and Dolores Mira. Mira's father was a foreman at an ice supplier while his mother was a stay-at-home mom. Mira attended Key West High School, where he played basketball, baseball, and football. A pitcher in baseball, Mira led his high school teams to two state championships in 1958 and 1959. He graduated from high school in 1960.

== College career ==
After high school, Mira joined the University of Miami to play college football under head coach Andy Gustafson in 1960. He had received an offer of $20,000 (Note: The Miami News later mentioned a $25,000 offer, but did not attribute it to a team.) to sign with the Baltimore Orioles of Major League Baseball, but turned it down to finish college instead. He was an immediate starter his freshman season, and set records for the University of Miami during his sophomore year.

Mira, nicknamed "the Matador," was well known for the "fastball" he would throw to receivers, influenced by his baseball prowess. He was also known as a "scrambler," frequently running on the field. Bill Peterson of the Florida State Seminoles once said of Mira: "He can throw, fake, and run. He keeps the pressure on you and he's the best I've ever seen."

One of the best games in Mira's collegiate career came as a junior in 1962 in the Gotham Bowl against the Nebraska Cornhuskers. Despite playing in 20 °F (−7 °C) weather in front of fewer than a thousand fans at Yankee Stadium, Mira threw for 321 yards, a Miami school record at the time, and was named the bowl game's most valuable player. Despite Mira's efforts, the Cornhuskers won by two points, 36–34. The previous year, the Hurricanes lost by a single point to Syracuse in the Liberty Bowl, in a game where Mira was reportedly recovering from a viral infection.

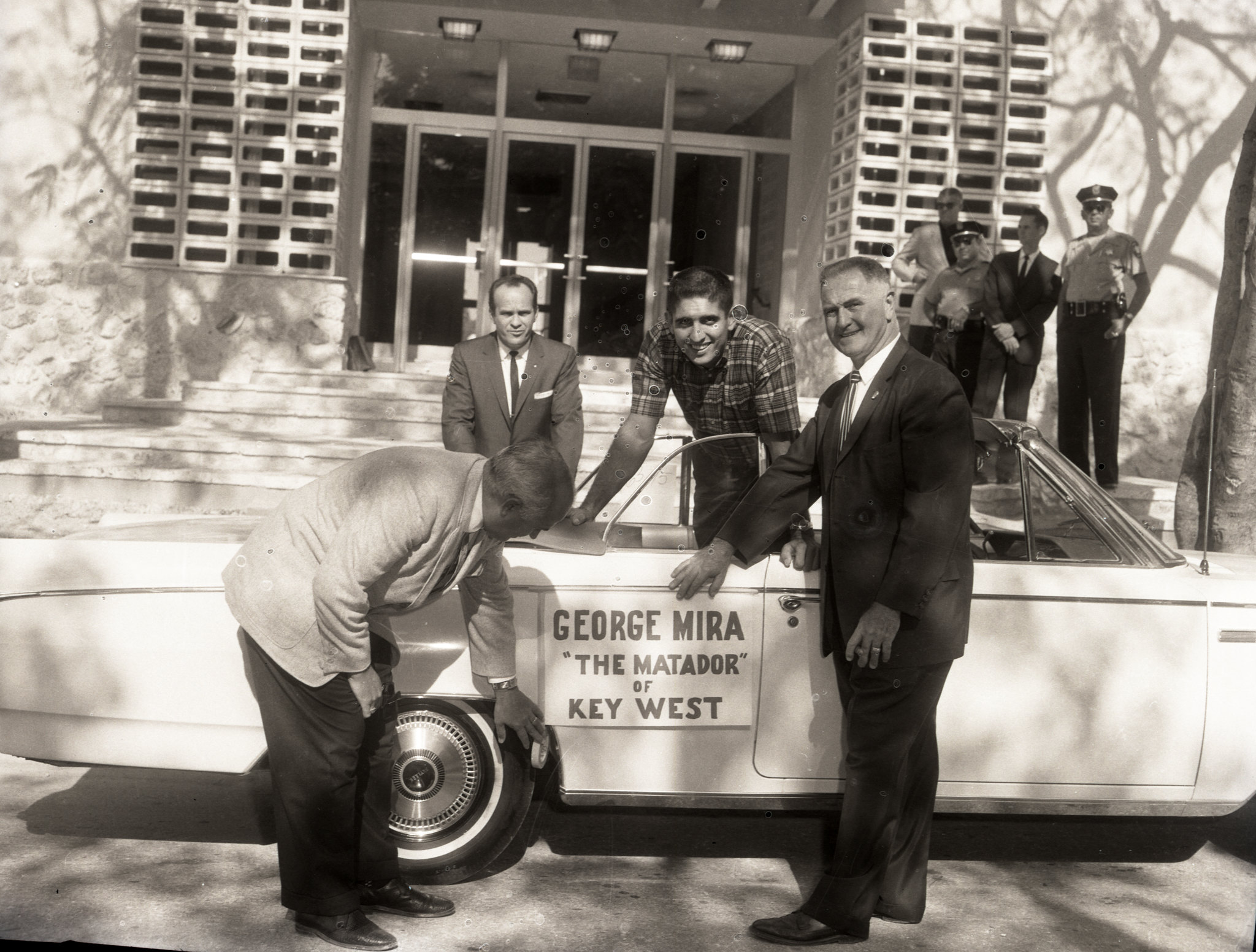
George Mira in a car in front of Key West City Hall with a sign that reads 'The Matador of Key West' in 1962.

Mira was a sensation in Key West while he played for Miami. At one point, the city hosted a "George Mira Day" where they temporarily named a street in his honor. At the start of the 1963 season Mira was the cover story for the college preview issue of Sports Illustrated. The article, written by Key West native John Underwood, was titled "One Wonderful Conch is this Mira" and featured many anecdotes about Mira's life growing up and becoming a star on the small island.

== Professional career ==
Mira was selected in the second round of the 1964 NFL draft, fifteenth overall, by the San Francisco 49ers. Primarily a reserve, he played for eight NFL seasons, 1964 through 1971, for the 49ers, Philadelphia Eagles, Baltimore Colts, and Miami Dolphins. He was a backup to John Brodie in San Francisco and to Bob Griese in Super Bowl VI as a member of the 1971 Dolphins. With the 49ers in 1964, he threw a pass to quarterback Billy Kilmer (who was playing running back) that Kilmer eventually fumbled; the fumble would be recovered by Minnesota Vikings defensive end Jim Marshall, who infamously ran 66 yards in the wrong direction.

Mira signed a multi-year contract with the Montreal Alouettes of the Canadian Football League (CFL) in August 1972, completing 92 of 168 passes for 1356 yards and 11 touchdowns and eight interceptions in 1973.

With the Birmingham Americans of the new World Football League (WFL) in 1974, he was the MVP of their championship game victory, completing 155 of 313 passes for 2,248 yards and 17 touchdowns and 14 interceptions during the season. Despite the success on the field, the Birmingham franchise folded in March. In 1975, with the Jacksonville Express of the WFL, he completed 123 of 254 passes for 1,675 yards and 12 touchdowns and interceptions. The league would cease operations late in the 1975 season.

Mira finished his career in 1977, playing six games for the Toronto Argonauts as a player-coach.

== Personal life and death ==
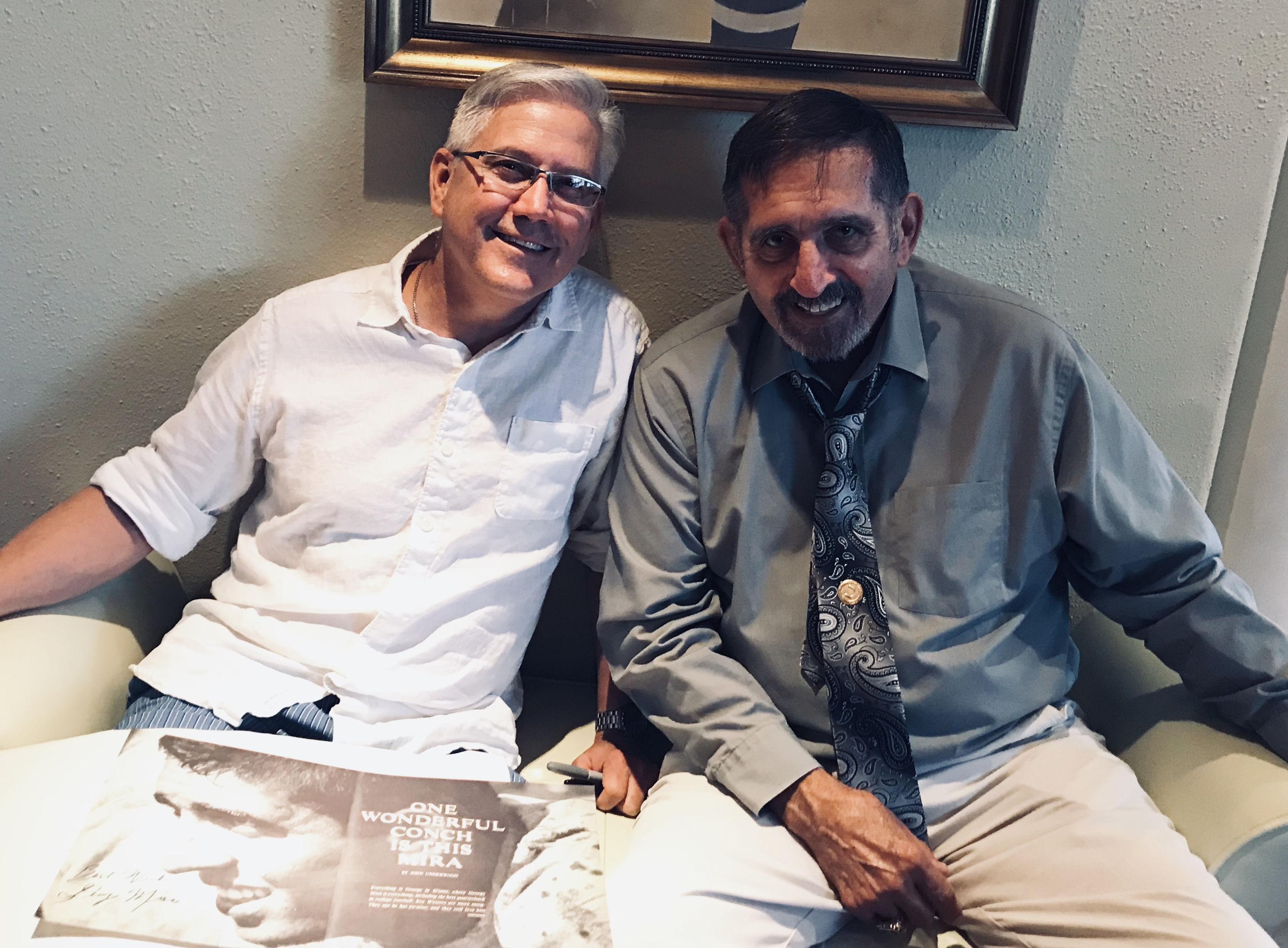
Mira (r) in 2018 autographs a copy of the Sports Illustrated feature "One Wonderful Conch Is This Mira".

After retiring from football, Mira returned to Florida and operated the Native Conch, a food concession at Fairchild Botanical Gardens in Coral Gables. For many years he owned a Key West restaurant called George Mira's Pizza Huddle, located across the street from the junior league baseball fields where it became a haven for post-game celebrations.

Mira operated his businesses with his wife, Nancy, She died on March 17, 2017. Their son, George Mira Jr., was an All-American linebacker at the University of Miami. George Mira Sr. died in Miami on December 9, 2025, at the age of 83.

== See also ==
- List of NCAA major college football yearly passing leaders
- List of NCAA major college football yearly total offense leaders
