= Detroit Wheels =

Defunct World Football League (WFL) team

Logo

General information
- Founded: December 13, 1973
- Folded: October 10, 1974
- Stadium: Rynearson Stadium
- Headquartered: Ypsilanti, Michigan

Personnel
- Owners: Louis Lee (team president), et al.
- General manager: Sonny Grandelius
- Head coach: Dan Boisture

League / conference affiliations
- World Football League; Central Division

The Detroit Wheels were an American football team, a charter member of the defunct World Football League.

== Founding ==
Soon after Gary Davidson announced the WFL's formation in October 1973, he was approached by a man named Bud Hucul about putting a team in Detroit. In a harbinger of things to come, however, it emerged that Hucul had a long history of legal problems, including 30 arrests and 27 lawsuits.

A more credible offer came from a consortium of ten Detroit-area investors who were formally awarded a franchise on December 13, 1973. The group would eventually expand to 33 people, including singer Marvin Gaye, Motown Records vice-president Esther Gordy Edwards, Milford Fabricating owner Edward Nishon, and Little Caesars founder Mike Ilitch (who would later own the Detroit Caesars, Drive, Red Wings and Tigers). Detroit attorney and philanthropist Louis Lee was named team president, while Sonny Grandelius, a former star running back at Michigan State, was the team's general manager.

The Wheels' owners didn't appear to make an initial capital investment, instead opting to pay team expenses out-of-pocket as they arose. The result was a team that was badly undercapitalized even by WFL standards. It showed during the WFL's initial draft. Despite selecting such future stars as Ed "Too Tall" Jones, Rick Middleton and Randy Grossman, the Wheels initially refused to spend more than $10,000 per player. They thus wound up signing only three of their 33 draft picks. (Michigan State track star Herb Washington, who later became pro baseball's only full-time pinch runner with the Oakland A's, rejected the Wheels offer, claiming the club was offering only "sandlot salaries".)

Desperate for players, the Wheels were forced to hold open tryouts, which ended with none of the 665 potential players who tried out making the team.

The owners also had trouble finding a place to play. Their first choice was Tiger Stadium, home of the NFL's Detroit Lions and Major League Baseball's Detroit Tigers. However, they were unable to lease the stadium due to pressure from the Lions. (The further damage to the turf that a second football team would cause was also a concern for the Tigers, especially since the WFL schedule began in July and coincided with much of the Tigers' season.) The Silverdome wouldn't be finished for another year, and University of Detroit Stadium (home of the Continental Football League's Michigan Arrows) had been demolished three years prior. Lee approached his alma mater, the University of Michigan, about playing at cavernous Michigan Stadium, only to be turned down.

Finally, the Wheels signed a deal to play at Eastern Michigan University's 15,500-seat Rynearson Stadium in Ypsilanti, Michigan, 37 miles (60 km) from downtown Detroit. The stadium had no lighting at the time, and the Wheels had to install their own; these lights remain at the stadium to this day (although subsequently updated). The club even hired EMU's head coach, Dan Boisture, to helm the Wheels.

== 1974 season ==
Things weren't encouraging on the field, either. The Wheels had a quarterback with Canadian Football League experience in Bubba Wyche (brother of former NFL quarterback and head coach Sam Wyche), but little in the way of protection (Wyche was sacked eleven times in one game) or receivers.

Only 10,631 people attended their first home game, and their final home contest drew an announced crowd of 6,351 fans (though actual attendance was closer to 2,000). One home game, against the Portland Storm, was moved to J.W. Little Stadium in London, Ontario; Storm owner Robert Harris was from London, and actually considered moving his club to the Ontario city and renaming them the London Lords, adopting the name of the recently folded semi-pro team of that name. The Canadian government, however, was firmly against the idea of any US-based pro football league playing in their country and encroaching on the established Canadian Football League; they had threatened to pass the Canadian Football Act a few months prior, which forced a proposed Toronto team to move to Memphis instead. Harris received $30,000 from local promoters and the Storm got their first win of the year, 18-7, in front of an announced crowd of 5,105 (though newspaper reports indicated there were only 2,000 people there), in the only World Football League game played outside the United States.

As the losses piled up, the team's ramshackle financial structure became more problematic. Boisture and Grandelius badly wanted to put together a viable professional football organization, but the owners refused all requests for more money. According to Grandelius, the owners "panicked" when they realized how dire the situation was, and simply walked away.

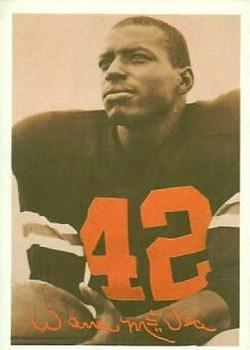
Detroit running back Warren McVea.

The result was what amounted to a club team in a professional league. For one home game, there were no programs available because the printer hadn't been paid. Boisture had to cancel several practices because the laundry bill went unpaid, leaving the team without uniforms. They couldn't pay their phone bill, and they were unable to reserve hotel rooms or fly to away games without advance payment. Players were forced to share food and rent due to missed paydays; several players ended up sharing a house. Wide receiver Jon Henderson had to pay his son's hospital bill out of pocket after finding out the team's insurance policy was cancelled for non-payment of premiums.

The situation prompted Wyche to write to league president Gary Davidson and beg the league office to intervene.

=== Television and radio ===
Media coverage was spotty at best. Only three Wheels games were known to have been televised, with just one actually seen locally. The season-opening loss to Memphis on July 10 was carried by local station WKBD-TV. The August 22 contest against Chicago in Ypsilanti was carried nationally on TVS, but was blacked-out on the network's local affiliate, also WKBD-TV. The August 28 game in Philadelphia was carried by fledgling Home Box Office to its handful of subscribers, none of which were in the Detroit area. Meanwhile, TVS had also planned to carry the September 25 game at New York, but begged off because the lighting at New York's Downing Stadium, dating from the 1940's, was inadequate for broadcast; in any case, both teams were on the brink of extinction by the time of the game. On radio, WWJ-AM carried all but one Wheels game, the July 21 contest in Hawaii.

=== Less money, more problems ===
The coaches were also feeling the effects as well. Assistant coach Owen Dejanovich was forced to live in the basement of fellow assistant Chick Harris for a time because several landlords refused to rent houses to him when they found out he worked for the Wheels (even after sending one landlord $1700 to cover two months rent and security deposit, a large sum of money at the time). Boisture was unable to film any games because the owners refused to provide filming equipment.

The low point came during the Wheels' eighth game, against the Philadelphia Bell. When the players arrived at John F. Kennedy Stadium, they discovered that there were no medical supplies or tape available. The Wheels refused to take the field until a Johnson & Johnson salesman donated tape so that the game could go on. (Philadelphia won, 27-23.)

After losing their first ten games, the Wheels got what would be their only win, 15-14 over the Florida Blazers at Orlando. Soon afterward, the league took control of the team and began searching for a new home. Their first choice was Shreveport, but the Houston Texans moved there instead and became the Steamer. They then tried to move to Louisville, but talks collapsed.

Automaker John DeLorean tried to buy the team in hopes of keeping it in Detroit, but backed out at the last minute. The next choice was Charlotte, where former New England Patriots general manager Upton Bell was hoping to put together financing for a WFL team. Although impressed with Wyche, he was unable to come to an agreement, and instead opted to buy the New York Stars and move them to Charlotte, as the Hornets.

== The end ==
With under-financed ownership, an ever-changing roster (no fewer than 83 players appeared in least one of Detroit's 14 contests in 1974), an ongoing recession, and lack of a significant fan base, the Wheels had little chance to succeed.

The schedule-maker offered Detroit no favors, either; the Wheels' first six contests were all against playoff teams. Ultimately, no fewer than ten of their 14 opponents qualified for the WFL post-season. Two of the other four games were against Chicago, who struggled in the second half of the season but were still hot when they met Detroit; and one against New York, who after moving to Charlotte actually qualified for the playoffs, only to be forced out of a wild-card game against Florida due to inadequate ticket sales.

On September 24, the Wheels stumbled into New York to play the Stars, in a game that had been transferred from Ypsilanti to Randall's Island (and also moved up a day because of Yom Kippur); that same day, the Wheels filed for bankruptcy. The Stars won easily, 37-7, then announced they would transfer to Charlotte. A week later, Detroit dropped a 14-11 decision to the former Houston franchise, now in Shreveport (coincidentally, one of the cities the Wheels had considered moving to).

It would be the last game that the Wheels would ever play. On October 7, in the face of $1.4 million in claims, Davidson postponed the Wheels' upcoming game against the Chicago Fire, and announced that the league would fold the team unless new owners could be found within three days. No buyers cropped up, and the WFL euthanized the Wheels along with the equally cash-strapped Jacksonville Sharks. While the franchise officially folded on October 10, players and coaches had been taking their uniforms and personal items home with them for some time to keep them from being seized. The Wheels franchise was the only one not reissued when the World Football League returned in 1975.

The Wheels finished their abbreviated season with the WFL's worst record at 1-13. However, considering their dire off-the-field situation, they were far more competitive than their record indicated: eight of their losses came by less than a touchdown, and they held fourth-quarter leads in seven games. Playing in the tough Central Division with the league's two best teams, Memphis (17-3) and Birmingham (15-5), made things even more difficult for the hapless Wheels.

After the debacle, Dan Boisture, who had helmed successful teams at the high school and college levels, decided to leave coaching altogether. Years later, he said, "When the Wheels went defunct, I could have gone with a couple pro teams, and I said, 'That's it.'...I was in a position to continue in pro ball or get something more stable. I made the right choice."

Future professional wrestler Stan Hansen attended the Wheels training camp, but was cut; nevertheless, he was promoted as a "former star" of the team when wrestling in a promotion in his hometown of Amarillo, Texas.

== Schedule and results ==
Key:	Win	Loss	Bye

=== 1974 regular season ===
Week	Day	Date	Opponent	Result	Attendance
1	Wednesday	July 10, 1974	at Memphis Southmen	L 15–34	30,122
2	Wednesday	July 17, 1974	Florida Blazers	L 14–18	10,631
3	Sunday	July 21, 1974	at Hawaiians	L 16–36	10,080
4	Wednesday	July 31, 1974	Birmingham Americans	L 18–21	14,614
5	Wednesday	August 7, 1974	at Birmingham Americans	L 22–28	40,367
6	Wednesday	August 14, 1974	Memphis Southmen	L 7–37	14,424
7	Thursday	August 22, 1974	Chicago Fire	L 23–35	10,300
8	Wednesday	August 28, 1974	at Philadelphia Bell	L 23–27	15,100
9	Monday	September 2, 1974	Portland Storm (at London, Ontario)	L 7–18	5,101
10	Friday	September 6, 1974	Southern California Sun	L 7–10	6,351
11	Wednesday	September 11, 1974	at Florida Blazers	W 15–14	9,003
12	Wednesday	September 18, 1974	at Southern California Sun	L 24–29	12,169
13	Tuesday	September 24, 1974	at New York Stars	L 7–37	4,220
14	Wednesday	October 2, 1974	at Shreveport Steamer	L 11–14	22,012
15	Wednesday	October 9, 1974	at Chicago Fire		cancelled
16	Wednesday	October 16, 1974	Hawaiians		cancelled
17	Wednesday	October 23, 1974	at Shreveport Steamer		cancelled
18	Wednesday	October 30, 1974	at Jacksonville Sharks		cancelled
19	Wednesday	November 6, 1974	Charlotte Hornets		cancelled
20	Wednesday	November 13, 1974	Philadelphia Bell		cancelled
