= Birmingham Vulcans =

World Football League team, 1975

Logo

General information
- Founded: March 1975
- Folded: October 1975
- Stadium: Legion Field
- Headquartered: Birmingham, Alabama
- Colors: Blue, Red, and White

Personnel
- General manager: Jack Gotta
- Head coach: Marvin Bass

League / conference affiliations
- World Football League; Eastern Division

Championships
- League championships: 1; 1975 (regular season title, league folded before World Bowl could be played)

The Birmingham Vulcans were a professional American football team located in Birmingham, Alabama. They were members of the five-team Eastern Division of the World Football League (WFL). The Vulcans, founded in March 1975, played in the upstart league's second and final season in 1975. The team was owned by a group of Birmingham businessmen with Ferd Weil as team president.

The Vulcans replaced the Birmingham Americans who had held the WFL franchise for Birmingham in 1974, winning World Bowl I in December 1974 before suffering financial collapse. The Vulcans were the best team in the league in 1975 with a 9–3 record and the best at the box office until the league folded 12 weeks into its second season. After the WFL ceased operations, the Vulcans were declared league champions by virtue of having the best record.

When the league folded, Birmingham and the Memphis Grizzlies attempted to get admitted into the National Football League for the 1976 season, although unlike the similar and more extensive effort in Memphis which involved actual cash deposits toward season tickets, it seemed to consist mainly of getting fans to sign a "statement of support" somewhat similar to a petition. When the Memphis effort failed, Vulcans followers were forced to accept the inevitable as well, and efforts to get the team into the more established league were abandoned.

The Vulcans name would be recycled for the Alabama Vulcans, a member of the American Football Association, in 1979.

As of April 2010, two former Vulcans players have been inducted into the Alabama Sports Hall of Fame. Birmingham native Johnny "Italian Stallion" Musso, who placed 4th in Heisman Trophy voting while playing for the Alabama Crimson Tide, was inducted in the Class of 1989. Larry Willingham, who played for the St. Louis Cardinals and retired for medical reasons in 1973 but made a comeback in 1974 with the Birmingham Americans, was inducted in the Class of 2003. Willingham was also elected to the Auburn Tigers football "1970s Team of the Decade."

== Schedule and results ==
Key:	Win	Loss	Bye

=== 1975 regular season ===
Week	Day	Date	Opponent	Result	Venue	Attendance	Source
1	Sunday	August 2, 1975	Chicago Winds	W 10–0	Legion Field	31,000	
2	Sunday	August 9, 1975	Philadelphia Bell	W 23–17	Legion Field	21,000	
3	Sunday	August 16, 1975	at Jacksonville Express	L 11–22	Gator Bowl Stadium	16,049	
4	Sunday	August 23, 1975	Southern California Sun	L 25–35	Legion Field	32,000	
5	Sunday	August 30, 1975	Shreveport Steamer	W 21–8	Legion Field	18,700	
6	Saturday	September 6, 1975	at Portland Thunder	W 26–8	Civic Stadium	6,342	
7	Saturday	September 13, 1975	San Antonio Wings	W 33–24	Legion Field	12,500	
8	Sunday	September 21, 1975	Charlotte Hornets	W 22–16	Legion Field	18,500	
9	Saturday	September 27, 1975	at Jacksonville Express	L 18–26	Gator Bowl Stadium	10,881	
10	Saturday	October 4, 1975	at Hawaiians	W 29–16	Aloha Stadium	18,894	
11	Sunday	October 12, 1975	at Memphis Grizzlies	W 18–14	Memphis Memorial Stadium	20,192	
12	Sunday	October 19, 1975	Memphis Grizzlies	W 21–0	Legion Field	35,000	

== See also ==
- Birmingham Americans
- 1975 World Football League season
- 1975 in sports
