= Florida Blazers =

Professional American football team

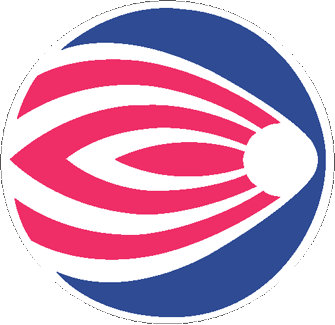
Logo

General information
- Founded: May 1974
- Ended: December 1974
- Stadium: Florida Citrus Bowl (28,000)
- Headquartered: Orlando, Florida
- Colors: Blue & Scarlet

Personnel
- Owners: David L. Williams and Rommie Loudd
- General manager: Rommie Loudd
- Head coach: Jack Pardee

League / conference affiliations
- World Football League; Eastern Division

The Florida Blazers were an American football team who played in the World Football League in 1974. The team moved to San Antonio in 1975 and became the San Antonio Wings.

== History ==
The Blazers began in 1974 when oceanographic engineer E. Joseph Wheeler bought the WFL rights to the Washington, D. C. area. The team was originally called the Washington Capitals, but the NHL expansion team of the same name objected, forcing him to change the name to the Washington Ambassadors. Wheeler wanted to share RFK Stadium with the Washington Redskins, but negotiations hit a snag over financing. He then flirted with playing in Baltimore or Annapolis, prompting him to change the team's name to the Washington-Baltimore Ambassadors. When it became apparent that Wheeler could not find a suitable stadium in the Baltimore-Washington area, he moved the club to Norfolk, Virginia as the Virginia Ambassadors. By this time, it was obvious that Wheeler's supposed $2–3 million of financing existed only on paper.

League president Gary Davidson got Wheeler in touch with former New England Patriots player and executive Rommie Loudd, who was fronting for a group of Orlando businessmen who had recently failed in their bid to get the NFL expansion team that became the Tampa Bay Buccaneers. Wheeler agreed to sell the team to Loudd's group, who moved the team to Orlando. The team was originally named the Orlando Suns, but due to objections from the Southern California Sun the name was changed once again, to the Florida Blazers. They were the first professional sports team based in Central Florida.

Loudd became managing general partner and president, making him the first African-American senior executive of a professional team in North America. David L. Williams, owner of the Holiday Inn franchise in the Orlando area, was majority owner.

The team set up shop in the Tangerine Bowl. Under coach Jack Pardee, quarterback Bob Davis (Joe Namath's former backup), running back Tommy Reamon and a dominating secondary, the Blazers ran away with the Eastern Division, finishing with a 14–6 record. They then upset the Memphis Southmen, owners of the league's best record, to advance to the World Bowl against the Birmingham Americans. Early in that game, Reamon scored what appeared to be the game's first touchdown, only to have it ruled a touchback because the officials believed that he fumbled the ball out of the end zone. Replays clearly showed that Reamon lost the ball after it broke the plane of the goal line. The missed call proved to be the difference, as the Blazers lost 22–21.

Off the field, the franchise was unraveling. The Blazers never drew well, leading Loudd to openly discuss moving the team to Atlanta in the middle of the season. The players and coaches were not paid for three months. In December 1974, shortly after the Blazers' defeat in the World Bowl, Loudd was arrested on tax evasion and cocaine trafficking charges. He was convicted on the latter charge and served three years in prison.

=== 1974 regular season ===
Key:	Win	Loss	Bye

Week	Day	Date	Opponent	Result	Attendance
1	Wednesday	July 10, 1974	Hawaiians	W 8–7	18,625
2	Wednesday	July 17, 1974	at Detroit Wheels	W 18–14	10,631
3	Wednesday	July 24, 1974	Houston Texans	W 15–3	15,729
4	Wednesday	July 31, 1974	at Houston Texans	L 6–7	16,268
5	Wednesday	August 7, 1974	at Chicago Fire	W 46–21	31,193
6	Wednesday	August 14, 1974	Jacksonville Sharks	W 33–26	23,890
7	Wednesday	August 21, 1974	Portland Storm	W 11–7	15,541
8	Wednesday	August 28, 1974	Memphis Southmen	L 18–26	15,746
9	Monday	September 2, 1974	at Birmingham Americans	L 7–8	36,529
10	Friday	September 6, 1974	at New York Stars	W 17–15	3,830
11	Wednesday	September 11, 1974	Detroit Wheels	L 14–15	9,003
12	Wednesday	September 18, 1974	Philadelphia Bell	W 24–21	10,417
13	Thursday	September 26, 1974	Chicago Fire	W 26–0	16,679
14	Wednesday	October 2, 1974	at Philadelphia Bell	W 30–7	7,150
15	Wednesday	October 9, 1974	at Chicago Fire	W 45–17	23,289
16	Wednesday	October 16, 1974	at Memphis Southmen	L 15–25	15,334
17	Wednesday	October 23, 1974	at Charlotte Hornets	W 15–11	23,613
18	Wednesday	October 30, 1974	at Birmingham Americans	L 18–26	21,872
19	Thursday	November 7, 1974	Portland Storm	W 23–0	11,676
20	Thursday	November 14, 1974	at Southern California Sun	W 27–24	28,213

=== Playoffs ===
Game	Day	Date	Opponent	Result	Attendance
Quarterfinals	Thursday	November 21, 1974	Philadelphia Bell	W 18–3	9,712
Semifinals	Friday	November 29, 1974	at Memphis Southmen	W 18–15	9,692
World Bowl 1	Thursday	December 5, 1974	at Birmingham Americans	L 21–22	32,376

== Relocation ==
After speculation that the Blazers might move to Akron, Ohio or Tulsa, San Antonio banker Norman Bevan bought the club in early March 1975, whereupon they became the San Antonio Wings.

The new Wings retained 16 former Blazers, including running back Jim Strong and tight end Luther Palmer. Larry Grantham, a linebacker on the 1974 Blazers, retired but joined the Wings' coaching staff. However, several former Blazers, including Pardee, wanted nothing more to do with the WFL. This forced the league to restock the team with an expansion draft. The new head coach was Perry Moss, a former head coach at Marshall and a former NFL assistant coach.

== See also ==
- 1974 World Football League season
- San Antonio Wings
