= Honolulu Stadium =

Stadium in Honolulu

- Termite Palace

- Location on the island of Oahu Location in Hawaii Honolulu Stadium (Hawaii)
- Location: Honolulu, Hawaii, U.S.
- Coordinates: 21.293°N 157.827°W
- Owner: Honolulu Stadium, Ltd. (1926–1975); State of Hawaii (1975–1976)
- Capacity: 25,000
- Surface: Natural grass

Construction
- Opened: November 11, 1926
- Closed: September 1975
- Demolished: December 1976
- Architects: Rothwell, Kangeter & Lester
- Main contractors: Walker & Olund

Tenants
- College football: University of Hawaii (NCAA) (1926–1974); Poi Bowl (1936–1939, 1945); Pineapple Bowl (1940–1941, 1947–1952); Hula Bowl (1960–1975); Other: Hawaii Islanders (PCL) (1961–1975); The Hawaiians (WFL) (1974–1975)

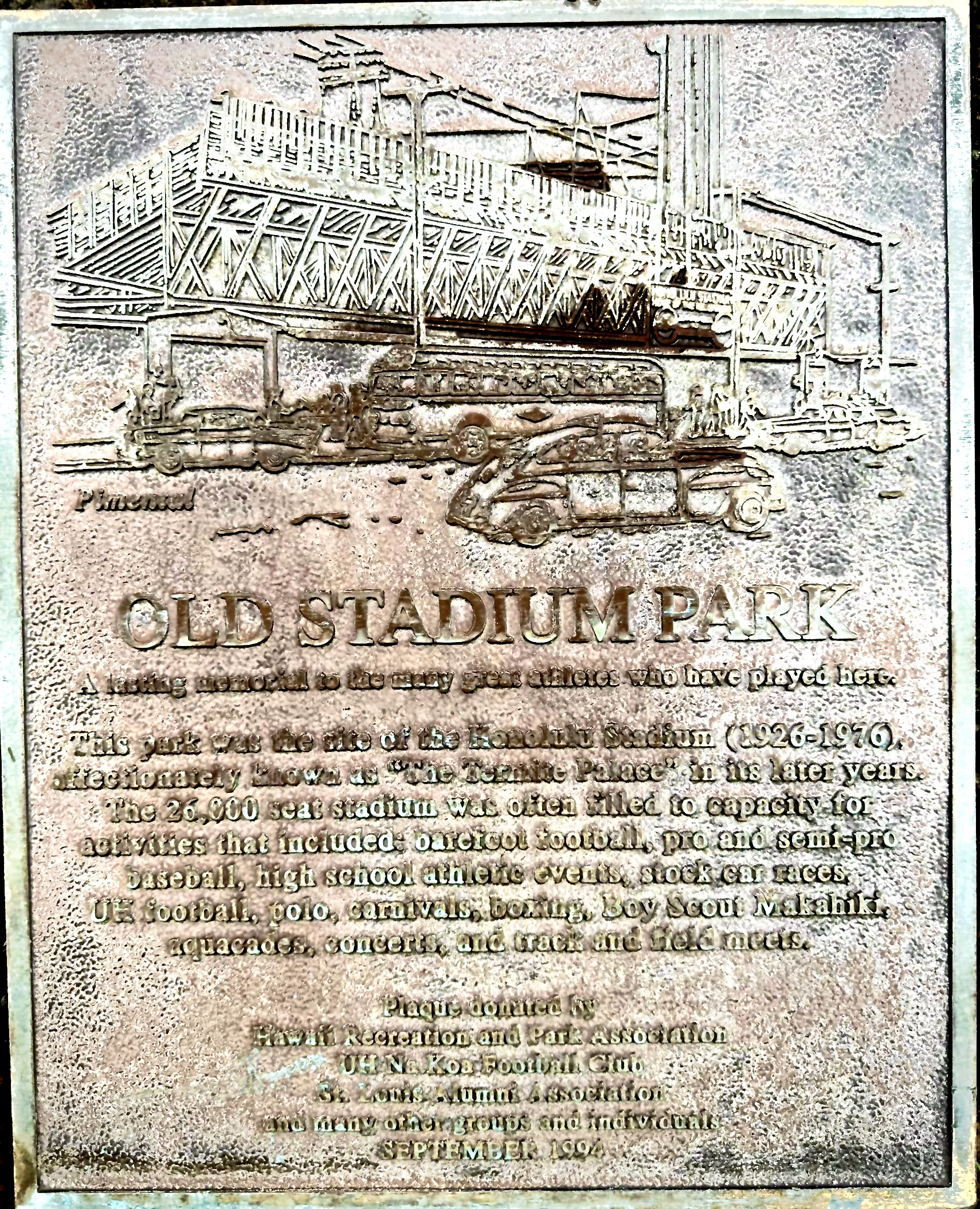
Honolulu Stadium, Historical Plaque

Honolulu Stadium was a multi-purpose stadium located in the Moʻiliʻili district of Honolulu, Hawaiʻi, at the corner of King and Isenberg Streets. Opened in 1926, it was the primary sports venue in Hawaiʻi preceding Aloha Stadium. During its final years, the stadium could hold about 25,000 fans; it was demolished in 1976. A public park, Old Stadium Park, now occupies the location. A plaque at the corner of King and Isenberg commemorates the stadium. Some of the property wall that stood behind the stands on the west end still remains.

== Description ==
The stadium was bounded by King Street (north, third base); Isenberg Street (east, left field); Citron Street and Date Street (south, right field); and Makahiki Way (west, first base). It was catty-corner to, and replaced, Mo'ili'ili Field as the venue of choice for the University of Hawaiʻi at Mānoa's athletic teams. Mo'ili'ili Field stood on the northeast corner of King and Isenberg, and was also bounded by South Beretania Street to the north and east. It still exists, in the form of "Mo'ili'ili Neighborhood Park", which has two ballfields within it.

In the baseball configuration, home plate was in the northwest corner; the third base line ran along King, and left field seating was bounded on the east by Isenberg. Field dimensions mentioned in local newspapers varied somewhat, but the consensus appears to be: left field 325 ft (99 m), right field 305 ft (93 m), and center field 430 ft (130 m). The football field ran parallel to the third base line, but away from the infield; the west end zone was near the first base line and the gridiron ran east-southeast, through right field and center field. The sideline seating for football was in right field and along the third base line.

== History ==
The stadium was owned throughout most of its history by Honolulu Stadium, Ltd., a private entity that was incorporated for $150,000 in 1926. As of 1943, the stadium was leased to the University of Hawaiʻi. By the 1960s, Honolulu Stadium had long since reached the end of its useful life. It was made mostly of wood and was frequently attacked by termites, resulting in it being nicknamed "the Termite Palace". In January 1975, the State of Hawaii purchased the stadium for $8.5 million—at that time, the University held a majority of the shares of Honolulu Stadium, Ltd.

The stadium was the longtime home of the University of Hawaii's college football team (then known as the Hawaii Rainbows) from 1926 to 1974, and the minor league baseball Hawaii Islanders of the Pacific Coast League (PCL) from 1961 to 1975. In its final years, the stadium also was home to The Hawaiians of the World Football League (WFL) in 1974 and 1975.

The stadium was the venue for several bowl games: the Poi Bowl (1936–1939, 1945), Pineapple Bowl (1940–1941, 1947–1952), and Hula Bowl (1960–1975). It also hosted high school football, world championship boxing matches, and was used for stock car racing. Track was also run at the stadium; it was the site of Hawaii's first night track meet in 1949.

Famous athletes who competed in Honolulu Stadium include Lou Gehrig and Babe Ruth in 1934; Joe DiMaggio, who hit a home run out of the park while playing for a military team in 1944; and Jesse Owens, who outran a horse in an 80-yard dash at the stadium in 1946. Irving Berlin performed at the stadium in 1945, Elvis Presley performed in 1957, and Billy Graham inspired a capacity crowd a year later.

The 1971 Hawaii Rainbows football team hosted the undefeated and top-ranked Nebraska Cornhuskers at the stadium in early December. The defending national champions were fresh off their "Game of the Century" win on Thanksgiving at No. 2 Oklahoma, and defeated the Rainbows, 45–3. Nebraska went on to defeat Alabama in the 1972 Orange Bowl on New Year's Day for a 13–0 season.

In the stadium's final event, the Islanders won their first PCL championship over the Salt Lake Gulls, in six games concluding on September 8, 1975. The stadium was replaced by Aloha Stadium in Halawa, which opened the following week.
