= Philadelphia Bell =

World Football League team (1974–1975)

Helmet
Logo

General information
- Founded: 1974
- Folded: October 1975
- Stadium: JFK Stadium (1974); Franklin Field (1975)
- Headquartered: Philadelphia, Pennsylvania, U.S.
- Colours: Blue & Gold

Personnel
- Owners: John B. Kelly Jr. John Bosacco
- Head coach: Ron Waller (1974); Willie Wood (1975)

League / conference affiliations
- World Football League; Eastern Division

The Philadelphia Bell was a franchise in the World Football League, which operated in 1974 and a portion of a season in 1975. The Bell played its home games in 1974 at JFK Stadium in South Philadelphia. The team logo was a representation of the Liberty Bell. In 1975, the team decided to stop playing at JFK and moved its games to Franklin Field.

== Formation ==
The Bell was one of just two WFL teams that maintained the same ownership in both 1974 and 1975 (the other being Canadian millionaire John Bassett's Memphis Southmen). The group was headed by John B. Kelly Jr., a respected business and sportsman in Philadelphia and part of the well-known Kelly family, which included his sister Grace Kelly, movie star-turned-princess of Monaco. The major money contributor behind the ownership group was John Bosacco, who came forward during the first season and took over the operations of the franchise. Bosacco believed that the WFL could survive and was instrumental in the removal of Gary Davidson as commissioner following the 1974 season.

== 1974 season ==
Led by head coach Ron Waller, the Bell appeared to be the most popular team in the fledgling league, announcing crowds of 55,534 for the home opener and 64,719 for the second home game (which was nationally televised as syndicated programming by TVS). These figures meant that at least on the surface, the Bell was outdrawing the NFL's Eagles, which averaged 59,206 fans for their seven home games the previous autumn.

Two weeks later, though, Frank Dolson of The Philadelphia Inquirer revealed that the Bell had inflated the gate on a scale previously unprecedented in professional sports. In his August 4, 1974, column, Dolson revealed that the Bell had sold block tickets to several area businesses at a discount. In turn, many of these businesses had given away the tickets for free or at reduced prices. Bell executive vice president Harry Leib admitted doing this in hopes of piquing interest, but when the Bell paid city taxes on the gates for the first two games, the actual paid attendance for the home opener was found to be only 13,855 (less than a quarter of the announced 55,534); the second game's paid attendance was an even smaller 6,200 (less than 10% of the announced 64,719). According to Leib, roughly 20,000 people got into the season opener for free, while another 10,000 received block tickets. The proportion was similar for the second game. Even worse, WFL administrative vice president Ted Palmquist admitted to the Philadelphia Daily News that the league was aware of the inflating of attendance, and that league commissioner Gary Davidson had approved it. Palmquist said that team and league officials feared the opening-day crowd would be swallowed up in the cavernous environment of 100,000-seat JFK Stadium. The Bell had only planned to do it once, but was forced to inflate the gate again for the second game when it learned the game would be nationally televised. In both cases, no one expected that most of the people who received the giveaways would actually show up. Palmquist said that he had told the Bell repeating the scheme would be "ill-advised". Nominal team president Kelly claimed that he was unaware of the plan, and was outraged both when he heard about it and about Leib's cavalier attitude. Nevertheless, the damage was done. "Papergate" (as it was dubbed by the press) made both the Bell and the WFL look foolish and proved to be a debacle from which neither recovered.

After the scandal broke, the Bell lost what goodwill it had. The draw was a total of only 62,126 fans for the last seven home games combined, or 2,000 fewer fans than the supposed crowd for the second home game. If only paid attendance for its first two games is counted, the Bell drew a paltry average of 9,131 fans per game for the season. The nadir came on October 16, 1974, when only 750 fans found their way to JFK for a Wednesday-night game played in a torrential downpour.

On the field, the Bell was mediocre; the team was led by flashy quarterback (QB) King Corcoran, who had spent most of his career in the minor leagues due to his refusal to accept a backup QB slot (Corcoran had even played under Coach Waller with the Pottstown Firebirds of the recently closed Atlantic Coast Football League). Philadelphia managed only a 9–11 mark in 1974, one game behind the Charlotte Hornets for the final playoff spot - the Bell was actually 8–11 on the field, but was awarded a win by forfeit when the Chicago Fire dissolved before it could travel to Philadelphia for the season finale.

At the request of WFL officials, though, the team advanced to the playoffs, anyway. The Hornets were originally slated to play the Florida Blazers, but the Blazers could sell only 1,000 advance tickets for the first-round matchup in Orlando, not nearly enough for the financially troubled Hornets (which had moved from New York City in midseason) to justify the trip. The Hornets would have been unable to cover their hotel and travel expenses, and the players would have been lucky to get $100 each for the game. The Bell, in contrast, was somewhat better financed, and could cover these expenses. The team traveled to Orlando, where it lost to the Blazers, 18-3, in front of less than 10,000 fans.

=== Season results ===
Week	Day	Date	Opponent	Result	Attendance
1	Wednesday	July 10, 1974	Portland Storm	W 33–8	55,534 (paid: 13,855)
2	Wednesday	July 17, 1974	at Houston Texans	L 0–11	26,227
3	Thursday	July 25, 1974	New York Stars	L 15–17	64,719 (paid: 6,200)
4	Wednesday	July 31, 1974	at Portland Storm	W 25–7	13,757
5	Wednesday	August 7, 1974	Memphis Southmen	W 46–15	12,396
6	Wednesday	August 14, 1974	at Chicago Fire	L 29–32	27,607
7	Wednesday	August 21, 1974	Southern California Sun	L 28–31	14,600
8	Wednesday	August 28, 1974	Detroit Wheels	W 27–23	15,100
9	Monday	September 2, 1974	at New York Stars	L 16–24	6,132
10	Thursday	September 5, 1974	at Jacksonville Sharks	L 30–34	17,851
11	Wednesday	September 11, 1974	Jacksonville Sharks	W 41–22 (OT)	7,230
12	Wednesday	September 18, 1974	at Florida Blazers	L 21–24	10,417
13	Wednesday	September 25, 1974	at Hawaiians	W 21–16	14,497
14	Wednesday	October 2, 1974	Florida Blazers	L 7–30	7,150
15	Wednesday	October 9, 1974	Hawaiians	L 22–25	4,900
16	Wednesday	October 16, 1974	Shreveport Steamer	L 25–30	750
17	Wednesday	October 23, 1974	at Southern California Sun	W 45–7	N/A
18	Wednesday	October 30, 1974	Chicago Fire	W 37–31	12,500
19	Wednesday	November 6, 1974	at Birmingham Americans	L 23–26	22,963
20	Wednesday	November 13, 1974	Chicago Fire	W 2–0 (forfeit)	cancelled

=== Playoffs ===
Game	Day	Date	Opponent	Result	Attendance
Quarterfinals	Thursday	November 21, 1974	at Florida Blazers	L 3–18	9,712

== 1975 season ==
Despite the Papergate fiasco, the Bell were reckoned as one of the WFL's stronger franchises and at least had the potential to have been successful had the league been better run. Bosacco was one of only three owners, along with the Memphis Southmen's John F. Bassett and The Hawaiians' Sam Battisone, thought to be capable of fielding a team in 1975; those three teams had been the only ones to meet payroll every week of the 1974 season.

As the 1975 season got underway, Coach Waller was replaced during training camp at Glassboro State College by future NFL Hall of Famer Willie Wood, making him the first African-American head coach of a modern pro football team.

Even on TV, the Bell couldn't get any respect. On August 29, 1975, WTAF aired a sports doubleheader, featuring a Philadelphia Wings lacrosse match followed by the Bell's game against the Southern California Sun in Anaheim. The football game was scheduled for 10:30 pm EDT, but since the Wings game ran long, viewers missed the beginning. Bell fans would miss the end of the contest, too: WTAF abruptly cut the broadcast off with six minutes remaining in the fourth quarter, pleading a "prior commitment". The station then signed off for the night at 1:30 am; the game (won by the Sun, 58-39) didn't end until 2:06 am. (According to a Philadelphia Daily News story, "keeping the final six minutes of the game on TV could have cost the Bell an estimated $5,000 in telephone line charges," so the broadcast, which the club was evidently paying for, was cut off at the three-hour mark.)

The Bell had a record of 4–7 in 1975 at the time of the league's dissolution. Attendance remained anemic, with the team's best-attended game at Franklin Field drawing barely 5,000 fans. After only 1,293 fans attended the Bell's October 18 contest, both the team and the WFL folded for good.

Vince Papale, the inspiration for the 2006 film Invincible, played wide receiver for the Bell for two seasons prior to his three years with the Philadelphia Eagles. Both Papale and King Corcoran had recently played in the Seaboard Football League, the minor league that was active at the time in the area.

=== Season results ===
Week	Day	Date	Opponent	Result	Venue	Attendance	Source
1	Saturday	August 2, 1975	Hawaiians	W 21–15	Franklin Field	3,266	
2	Saturday	August 9, 1975	at Birmingham Vulcans	L 17–23	Legion Field	21,000	
3	Saturday	August 16, 1975	at Shreveport Steamer	L 3–10	State Fair Stadium	12,016	
4	Saturday	August 23, 1975	Memphis Grizzlies	W 22–18	Franklin Field	5,051	
5	Saturday	August 29, 1975	at Southern California Sun	L 39–58	Anaheim Stadium	17,811	
6	Saturday	September 6, 1975	at Charlotte Hornets	L 0–10	American Legion Memorial Stadium	10,500	
7	Saturday	September 13, 1975	Portland Thunder	L 10–25	Franklin Field	4,104	
8	Saturday	September 20, 1975	at Jacksonville Express	L 10–16	Gator Bowl Stadium	10,296	
9	Saturday	October 4, 1975	San Antonio Wings	W 42–38	Franklin Field	2,357	
10	Saturday	October 11, 1975	at Hawaiians	L 13–14	Aloha Stadium	10,789	
11	Saturday	October 18, 1975	Charlotte Hornets	W 18–10	Franklin Field	1,293	
