= List of LSU Tigers football All-Americans =

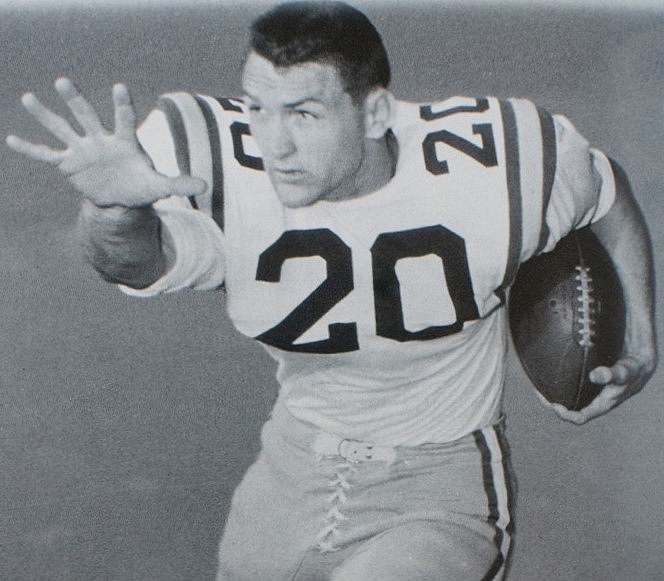
Billy Cannon, 1959 Heisman Trophy winner and two-time unanimous All-American halfback for LSU

A College Football All-America Team is selected annually by various organizations to recognize each season's most outstanding players at each position. Certain organizations are recognized by the NCAA as "official" selectors, whose teams are used to determine consensus and unanimous All-Americans. The LSU Tigers football team has had 37 players recognized as consensus All-Americans, with 11 of those being unanimous selections. Gaynell Tinsley was LSU's first consensus (1935) and unanimous All-American (1936).

Five LSU players have been recognized as consensus All-Americans twice: Tinsley, Billy Cannon, Tommy Casanova, Charles Alexander, and Grant Delpit. Cannon is the only LSU player to be unanimously selected twice, doing so in 1958 and 1959. Casanova is LSU's only three-time All-American; he was named a first-team All-American by at least one selector in 1969, 1970, and 1971.

== Key ==
^{†}	Consensus selection
^{‡}	Unanimous selection

=== Selectors ===
AFCA	American Football Coaches Association	AP	Associated Press	CBS	CBS Sports	CW	Collier's Weekly
CNNSI	CNN/Sports Illustrated	CP	Central Press Association	GNS	Gannett News Service	FN	Football News
FWAA	Football Writers Association of America	NBC	NBC Sports	NEA	Newspaper Enterprise Association	PFW	Pro Football Weekly
Rivals	Rivals.com	Scout	Scout.com	SH	Scripps Howard	SN	The Sporting News
SI	Sports Illustrated	Time	Time magazine	UPI	United Press International	WC	Walter Camp Football Foundation

== Selections ==
Year	Name	Position	Selector(s)	Refs
1935	Jesse Fatherree	HB	NEA-3	
1935	Osborne Helveston	G	CP	
1935	Abe Mickal	FB	LIB-2	
1935	Gaynell Tinsley	End	AP, UP, LIB, COL, NEA, INS, NANA-2, CP-3, NYS, PTH, CNS	
1936	Gaynell Tinsley	End	AAB; AP, COL, INS, LIB, NANA, NEA, SN, UP, CP, WC	
1937	Eddie Gatto	T	AP-3	
1937	Pinky Rohm	FB	INS-3	
1938	Eddie Gatto	T	ID-2	
1939	Ken Kavanaugh	End	AP-2, INS, NW, LIB, SN, UP, BL, CP-2, CW, LIFE	
1940	John W. Goree	G	CP-4	
1943	Steve Van Buren	HB	AP-3	
1946	Walt Barnes	T	FWAA-2, NEA-3	
1946	Clyde Lindsey	End	CP-2	
1951	George Tarasovic	C	NEA	
1953	Sid Fournet	T	AP-2	
1954	Sid Fournet	T	AFCA, AP-2, FWAA, INS, NEA, UP, CP-2, WC	
1955	Joe Tuminello	End	AP-3, NEA-3	
1957	Jim Taylor	FB	FWAA, AP-3	
1958	Billy Cannon	HB	AFCA, AP, FWAA, NEA, SN, UPI, CP, Time, WC	
1958	Max Fugler	C	AP-3, FWAA, NEA-3, UPI-2	
1959	Billy Cannon	HB	AP, UPI, NEA, CP, WC, AFCA, FWAA, SN, Time	
1959	Max Fugler	C	UPI-3, CP-3	
1961	Roy Winston	G	AFCA, AP, FWAA, NEA, SN, UPI, CP, Time, WC	
1962	Fred Miller	T	AFCA-3, AP-3, FWAA, NEA-2, SN-2	
1962	Jerry Stovall	HB	AFCA, AP, FWAA, NEA, SN, UPI, Time, WC	
1964	Richard Granier	C	AP-2	
1964	Remi Prudhumme	DT	NEA, FN	
1965	Doug Moreau	End	FN	
1965	George Rice	DT	CP-2, Time, SN	
1967	John Garlington	DE	AFCA, UPI-2	
1967	Barry Wilson	G	NEA-2	
1969	George Bevan	LB	AFCA, AP-2, CP-2, FWAA, NEA-2	
1969	Tommy Casanova	DB	FN	
1970	Mike Anderson	LB	AFCA, AP, CP, FWAA, NEA-2, UPI, FN	
1970	Tommy Casanova	DB	AFCA, AP, CP-2, UPI-2	
1970	John Sage	T	AP-2	
1971	Tommy Casanova	DB	FWAA, UPI, FN, Time, WC	
1971	Ron Estay	DT	AFCA, AP-2, NEA-2, UPI-2	
1972	Warren Capone	LB	FWAA	
1972	Bert Jones	QB	AFCA, NEA, UPI, FN, Time, SN	
1973	Warren Capone	LB	AFCA, FWAA	
1973	Tyler Lafauci	G	AFCA, AP, NEA	
1974	Mike Williams	DB	AFCA, SN, Time	
1977	Charles Alexander	RB	AFCA, AP-2, FWAA, UPI, NEA-2, WC	
1978	John Adams	DE	AP-3	
1978	Charles Alexander	RB	AFCA, AP-2, FWAA, UPI-2, NEA, SN, WC	
1978	Robert Dugas	T	AP-2, NEA-2	
1979	John Adams	DE	UPI-2	
1979	Willie Teal	DB	NEA-2	
1980	Lyman White	DE	NEA-2	
1982	James Britt	DB	NEA	
1982	Al Richardson	LB	AP-2, UPI-2	
1983	Eric Martin	WR	GNS-2, SN	
1984	Dalton Hilliard	RB	NEA-2	
1984	Lance Smith	G	AFCA, UPI, NEA	
1984	Michael Brooks	LB	AP, GNS, HS	
1986	Eric Andolsek	G	FN-3	
1986	Wendell Davis	WR	AP-2, FWAA, UPI-2, FN-2, SN	
1986	Henry Thomas	DT	AP-3, FN-3	
1987	Nacho Albergamo	C	AP, UPI, WC, AFCA, FWAA, SH, SN	
1987	Eric Andolsek	G	AP-3	
1987	Wendell Davis	WR	AFCA, FWAA, SH, SN	
1988	Greg Jackson	DB	GNS	
1989	David Browndyke	K	GNS	
1996	Kevin Faulk	All-purpose	AP	
1996	David LaFleur	TE	AP-3, WC	
1997	Alan Faneca	G	AP, FWAA, WC, FN	
1997	Kevin Faulk	All-purpose	AP-3	
1997	Chad Kessler	P	AP, WC, SN, FN	
1998	Kevin Faulk	All-purpose	AP-3	
1998	Anthony McFarland	DT	AP, FN	
1998	Todd McClure	C	AFCA	
2001	Trev Faulk	LB	AP-2	
2001	Josh Reed	WR	WC, FWAA, AP, SN, PFW, SI	
2002	Bradie James	LB	AP-2, SN, AFCA	
2003	Skyler Green	RS	SI, ESPN	
2003	Chad Lavalais	T	WC, FWAA, AP, SN, SI, ESPN, Rivals	
2003	Stephen Peterman	G	SN, SI, ESPN, Rivals	
2003	Corey Webster	CB	AFCA	
2003	Ben Wilkerson	C	AP-2, SN-2	
2004	Marcus Spears	DE	AP, AFCA, WC, CFN	
2004	Corey Webster	CB	AFCA, AP-2, SN	
2004	Ben Wilkerson	C	AFCA, AP-3, SN, WC-2	
2005	Skyler Green	RS	Rivals	
2005	Kyle Williams	DT	PFW, Rivals	
2005	Claude Wroten	DT	CFN	
2006	Glenn Dorsey	DT	AP, AFCA, SI, PFW, CBS, Rivals	
2006	LaRon Landry	S	AP, AFCA, PFW, ESPN	
2007	Glenn Dorsey	DT	AP, AFCA, FWAA, WC, SN, SI, PFW, CFN, Rivals, Scout	
2007	Ali Highsmith	LB	CBS	
2007	Craig Steltz	S	AP, FWAA, WC, SI, ESPN, CBS, CFN, Rivals, Scout	
2008	Herman Johnson	G	AP, WC-2	
2009	Patrick Peterson	CB	PFW, ESPN	
2010	Josh Jasper	K	FWAA, SN	
2010	Drake Nevis	DT	CBS	
2010	Patrick Peterson	CB	AFCA, AP, FWAA, SN, WC, CBS, CFN, ESPN, PFW, Rivals, Scout, SI	
2011	Will Blackwell	G	AP-2, SN, ESPN, Scout, Yahoo	
2011	Morris Claiborne	CB	AFCA, AP, FWAA, SN, WC, CBS, ESPN, PFW, Scout, SI, Yahoo	
2011	Tyrann Mathieu	CB	AP, FWAA, SN, WC, CBS, ESPN, Scout, SI, Yahoo	
2011	Sam Montgomery	DE	AP-3, FWAA, PFW, Scout	
2011	Brad Wing	P	AP, CBS, Scout, SI	
2012	J. C. Copeland	FB	PFW	
2012	Bennie Logan	DT	PFW	
2012	Kevin Minter	LB	AP-2, SI	
2012	Sam Montgomery	DE	AP-3	
2012	Eric Reid	S	AFCA, FWAA, ESPN, Scout	
2013	Odell Beckham Jr.	All-purpose	FWAA, CBS	
2014	La'el Collins	T	AP-2	
2015	Vadal Alexander	T	AP-3, SI-2, WC-2, SN-2	
2015	Leonard Fournette	RB	AP, WC, FWAA, CBS, ESPN, SI-2	
2015	Jalen Mills	CB	CBS	
2016	Jamal Adams	S	AP-2, CBS, USAT, Athlon, SI-2	
2016	Kendell Beckwith	LB	AP-3, WC-2, SN-2, SI-2	
2016	Ethan Pocic	C	FWAA, AP-3, WC-2, SN-2	
2016	Tre'Davious White	CB	AFCA, WC, SN-2	
2017	Will Clapp	C	Athlon-2, CFN-2	
2017	Donte Jackson	CB	SN-2	
2017	Devin White	LB	FWAA-2, Athlon-2, USAT-2	
2017	Greedy Williams	CB	AP-3, Athlon-3	
2018	Grant Delpit	S	AP, WC, SN, FWAA, AFCA, SI	
2018	Cole Tracy	K	AP-2, WC-2, SN-2, AFCA-2, SI-2	
2018	Devin White	LB	AP, WC, SN, AFCA, SI, FWAA-2	
2018	Greedy Williams	CB	WC, FWAA, AFCA, AP-2, SN-2, AFCA-2, SI-2	
2019	Joe Burrow	QB	AFCA, AP, CBS, FWAA, SI, SN, WC	
2019	Ja'Marr Chase	WR	AFCA, AP, CBS, FWAA, SI, SN, WC	
2019	Lloyd Cushenberry	C	FWAA-2	
2019	Grant Delpit	S	AFCA, CBS, SN, WC	
2019	Damien Lewis	G	Athletic	
2019	Derek Stingley Jr.	CB	AFCA, AP, CBS, SI, SN	
2020	Derek Stingley Jr.	CB	AFCA	
2020	Cade York	K	ESPN, USAT	
2020	Zach Von Rosenberg	P	Athletic	
2023	Jayden Daniels	QB	AP, AFCA, FWAA, SN, Athlon, ESPN, CBS, Athletic, USAT, SI	
2023	Malik Nabers	WR	AP, AFCA, FWAA, SN, WC, ESPN, CBS, Athlon, Athletic, USAT, SI	
2024	Will Campbell	OT	AP, AFCA, FWAA, WC, ESPN, CBS, Athletic, USAT	
2025	Mansoor Delane	CB	AFCA, AP, FWAA, TSN, WCFF, Athletic, CBS, USAT	
