= World Football League (2008–2010) =

- Classification: Low-level minor league
- First season: 2008
- Folded: 2010
- Sports fielded: American football
- Country: United States
- Most titles: Oklahoma Thunder (3)

The World Football League was a professional American football minor league which operated for three seasons, from 2008 through 2010. It was named for the short-lived World Football League which served as a competitor to the NFL in the mid-1970s.

== History ==
In 2007, the rights to the "World Football League" name and logo were purchased by Chip Pierce of Beaumont, Texas. The league was brought back to life as a minor league system that did not compete with the NFL, but gave players of a higher talent level than that of the many players involved in semi-pro football the opportunity to showcase their skills. Players like Willie Ponder who have exited the NFL but had aspirations of returning and players like Kejuan Jones or Prentiss Elliot who were looking to get a shot to make in the NFL. At the end of the season SiteInDeX, Inc., purchased the WFL from Pierce.

=== 2008 ===
The inaugural rebirth season of the WFL as a minor league system had 8 teams in Texas, Arkansas, and Oklahoma.

Team	W	L	T	Pct.	PF	PA
Oklahoma Thunder	8	0	0	1.000	406	77
Austin Gamebreakers	8	1	0	.889	343	156
Southeast Texas Demons	7	3	0	.700	196	124
Dallas Diesel	6	4	0	.600	193	160
Arkansas War Cats	3	6	0	.333	86	227
Texas Bulldogs	1	7	0	.125	62	351
Louisiana Lightning	0	3	0	.000	22	57
Texarkana Warriors	0	9	0	.000	30	186

==== Playoffs ====
Quarterfinals (September 6, 2008):
Dallas Diesel 66 vs. Arkansas War Cats 6
Southeast Texas Demons 0 vs. Texas Bulldogs 6

Semifinals (September 20, 2008):
Austin Gamebreakers 32 vs. Dallas Diesel 10
Oklahoma Thunder 66 vs. Texas Bulldogs 6

World Bowl II (October 18, 2008):
Oklahoma Thunder 29 vs. Austin Gamebreakers 6
World Bowl II (continuing the number from the original league) was held at Independence Stadium in Shreveport, Louisiana, and crowned Thunder as the first champion of the WFL in the minor league era.

=== 2009 ===
The second season saw large increase, as the league now contained 14 full time teams, and featured teams in Kansas, Nebraska, Oklahoma, Louisiana, Texas, Iowa and Arkansas. The league was divided to three separate divisions and Oklahoma Thunder (Great Plains), Iowa Sharks (Heartland) and Dallas Diesel (South) finished as divisions champions.

==== Playoffs ====
Quarterfinals (August 15, 2009):
Texas Bulldogs 13 vs. Austin Gamebreakers 30
Dallas Diesel 34 vs. Kansas Kaos 14
Iowa Eagles 0 vs Iowa Sharks 34
Oklahoma Thunder 70 vs. Arkansas War Cats 7

Semifinals (August 22, 2009):
Dallas Diesel 20 vs. Iowa Sharks 10
Austin Gamebreakers 6 vs. Oklahoma Thunder 101

World Bowl III (August 29, 2009):
Oklahoma Thunder 43 vs. Dallas Diesel 12
World Bowl III was held at LaFortune Stadium in Tulsa, as the Thunder repeated the result from previous year.

=== 2010 ===
The third and final year of the WFL featured 13 teams that were divided to four divisions, with Oklahoma (Great Plains), Des Moines Blaze (Heartland), Saint Louis Bulldogs (Central) and Eagle Creek Marauders (South) finishing on top. The Thunder finished the season 11–0, and won all 40 of their games in WFL history.

==== Playoffs ====
Quarterfinals (July 17, 2010):
Saint Louis Bulldogs 55 vs. Oklahoma City Wolverines 14
Kansas Kaos 15 vs Eagle Creek Marauders 45

Semifinals (July 24, 2010):
Des Moines Blaze 50 vs. Saint Louis Bulldogs 21
Oklahoma Thunder 63 vs. Eagle Creek Marauders 0

World Bowl IV (July 31, 2010 at East Tulsa Sports Complex):
Oklahoma Thunder 52 vs. Des Moines Blaze 10

== Structure and purpose ==
The revived World Football League operated as a minor professional football league rather than a direct competitor to the National Football League (NFL). Similar to other short-lived leagues in the United States, it provided playing opportunities for athletes outside the NFL structure, including former professional players and those seeking additional exposure.

Like many independent football leagues, such organizations often face financial and operational instability, including inconsistent team participation and limited long-term investment. These challenges have been widely identified as common factors in the failure of alternative professional football leagues in the United States.

Following the 2010 season, several franchises ceased operations or departed for other organizations, including the Oklahoma Thunder. The league did not stage a further season and its remaining structure was subsequently absorbed into the Alliance Football League, effectively ending its operations.

== End ==
Before the 2011 season, most of the teams in the new WFL either folded or left for other leagues. In a key defection, three-time World Bowl winner Oklahoma Thunder left for the Gridiron Developmental Football League. The new WFL merged with another league to become the Alliance Football League. The merged league began the 2011 season with six teams: the Texas Bulldogs, Dallas-Fort Worth Heat, Dallas Diesel, Central Texas Gorillas, Houston Pride of Texas, and Oklahoma City Wolverines. World Bowl V, scheduled for Tulsa, was moved to Shreveport, Louisiana, and renamed the National Championship. This merger and renaming ended the minor league rebirth of the WFL.

== See also ==
- List of leagues of American football
