= Buddy Brown (offensive guard) =

American football player (born 1950)

No. 65
- Position: Offensive guard

Personal information
- Born: June 9, 1950 (age 76); Tallahassee, Florida, U.S.

Career information
- College: Alabama

Career history
- 1971–1973: Alabama Crimson Tide
- 1974: Birmingham Americans
- 1975–1979: Winnipeg Blue Bombers

Awards and highlights
- World Bowl champion (1974); National champion (1973); Consensus All-American (1973); Jacobs Blocking Trophy (1973); 2× First-team All-SEC (1972, 1973)

Halver "Buddy" Brown Jr. (June 9, 1950) is an American former football player. He played offensive guard for the University of Alabama Crimson Tide from 1971 through 1973 and was a member of the 1973 national championship team and a consensus selection to the 1973 College Football All-America Team. After his collegiate career, Brown played professionally for the Birmingham Americans in 1974 and the Winnipeg Blue Bombers from 1975 through 1979.

== Early life ==
As a native of Tallahassee, Florida, He worked on the Farm with his Dad. Brown played defensive positions on the Leon High School football team as a youth. During his senior season, Brown averaged 15 tackles per game and earned All-State honors for his on-field performance. After his senior season, Brown signed to play college football at the University of Alabama.

== College career ==
As a redshirt freshman with the Crimson Tide for the 1970 season, Brown played the defensive tackle position. However, after spring practice in 1971, he was moved from defensive tackle to offensive tackle. For the 1971 season, Brown started at the offensive tackle position and was named to both the SEC All-Sophomore team as well as to several national Sophomore All-American teams. Brown continued to anchor the offensive line in both his junior and senior years at Alabama. In recognition for his play during his senior year, Brown was named as a consensus selection to the 1973 College Football All-America Team and was awarded the 1973 Jacobs Blocking Trophy.

== Professional career ==
Although he was drafted 392nd overall by the New York Giants in the 16th round of the 1974 NFL draft, in February 1974, Brown signed with the Birmingham Americans of the World Football League. During his one season with Birmingham, Brown was named to the 1974 All-WFL Team and was part of the Americans' World Bowl champion team.

In March 1975, Brown signed with the Winnipeg Blue Bombers of the Canadian Football League after he played his rookie season as a professional with Birmingham. In his first season with Winnipeg, Brown earned a starting position at offensive guard. During his tenure as a member of the Blue Bombers, Brown was named a Western All-Star in 1976 and 1977. Brown retired from the Bombers in June 1979 after five seasons with the team.

He now resides outside of Defuniak Springs, FL and is an Area Manager for Conrad Yelvington Distributors.
