= CSFL =

CSFL may refer to:

- Central States Football League, a former NAIA football conference
- Central States Football League (1948–1953), a minor professional American football league in which the Racine Raiders played
- Central States Football League (1962–1975), a minor professional American football league in which the Racine Raiders played
- Collegiate Sprint Football League, one of two governing bodies for sprint football, an American football variation
- Cerebrospinal fluid leak
- Coral Springs, Florida, city in Florida and the United States
