= 1972 All-South Independent football team =

American college football season

The 1972 All-South Independent football team consists of American football players chosen by the Associated Press for their All-South independent teams for the 1972 NCAA University Division football season.

== Offense ==
Quarterback

- Gary Huff, Florida State
  - Honorable Mention: Eddie McAshan, Georgia Tech

Running backs

- Hodges Mitchell, Florida State
- Doyle Orange, Southern Mississippi
  - Honorable Mentions: Chuck Foreman, Miami; Tom Smith, Miami

Wide receivers

- Barry Smith, Florida State
- Jim Robinson, Georgia Tech
  - Honorable Mentions: Doug Parker, Southern Mississippi; Mark Wakefield, Tampa; Jaime Garza, Tulane

Tight end

- Gary Parris, Florida State
  - Honorable Mention: Alex Edlin, Tampa

Tackles

- Rick Lantz, Georgia Tech
- Mike Koesling, Tulane
  - Honorable Mentions: Jeff Hollinsworth, Tulane; Darlee Nelson, Tampa

Guards

- Phil Arnold, Florida State
- Clint Tapper, Southern Mississippi
  - Honorable Mentions: John Sargent, Georgia Tech; Mike Owens, Tulane

Center

- Fletcher Carr, Tampa
  - Honorable Mention: Steve Wade, Tulane

== Defense ==
Defensive ends

- Wilbur Grooms, Tampa
- Fred Cook, Southern Mississippi
  - Honorable Mentions: Brad Bourne, Georgia Tech; Mike Trust, Tulane; Mike Hernandez, Tampa; Randy Lee, Tulane

Defensive tackles

- Tony Cristiani, Miami
- John Matuszak, Tampa
- Charles Hall, Tulane
  - Honorable Mentions: Rubin Carter, Miami; Lee Coleman, Southern Mississippi; Mike Barnes, Miami

Linebackers

- Larry Strickland, Florida State
- Mike Mullen, Tulane
- Mike Dennery, Southern Mississippi
  - Honorable Mentions: Joe Harris, Georgia; Harold Sears, Miami; Glenn Harder, Tulane

Defensive backs

- Randy Rhino, Georgia Tech
- George Ewing, Tulane
  - Honorable Mentions: Eugene Bird, Southern Mississippi; Burgess Owens, Miami; James Thomas, Florida State; Eddie Caldwell, Tampa; David Lee, Tulane

== Special teams ==
Kicker

- Lee Gibson, Tulane
  - Honorable Mention: Bobby Thigpen, Tulane

Punter

- Ray Guy, Southern Mississippi
  - Honorable Mention: Mike Burke, Miami
