= Saxon Stadium =

Multi-purpose stadium in Pennsylvania, United States

- Interactive map of Saxon Stadium
- Former names: Tullio Stadium
- Address: Erie, P United States
- Coordinates: 42.1033°N 80.0531°W
- Owner: Mercyhurst University
- Operator: Mercyhurst University
- Capacity: 2,300
- Type: Multi-purpose stadium
- Surface: FieldTurf
- Current use: Football; Soccer; Lacrosse; Field hockey

Construction
- Opened: 1996; 30 years ago
- Renovated: 2019

Tenants
- Mercyhurst Lakers (NCAA) teams: football (1996–present); men's and women's lacrosse (1996–present); women's field hockey (1996–present); Other teams: Erie Express (GDFL/TPFL) (2021–); Erie Commodores FC (NPSL/UWS) (2022–)

Website
- hurstathletics.com/saxon-stadium

Saxon Stadium (formerly Tullio Stadium) is a 2,300-seat multi-purpose stadium located on the campus of Mercyhurst University in Erie, Pennsylvania. A part of the William J. Vorscheck Athletic Complex, it is the home of the Mercyhurst Lakers field hockey, football, lacrosse and marching band programs. It also serves as home to the Erie Express semi-professional football team and the Erie Commodores FC soccer team in the National Premier Soccer League and United Women's Soccer.

The Mercyhurst Lakers men's and women's soccer teams play their home games at Mercyhurst Soccer Field, another facility at the University.

== History ==
Since the program's inception in 1981, Mercyhurst football had played their home games at Erie Veterans Memorial Stadium. However, when the venue was unavailable for the 1996 season, Mercyhurst officials decided this was the time to accomplish their long-term vision of an on-campus football stadium, thereby building Saxon Stadium.

=== Naming ===
The stadium is named after John and Patty Saxon, whose significant contribution to the university athletic program and stadium renovations gained them the naming rights.
