= Van DeCree =

American football player

Profile
- Position: Defensive end

Personal information
- Listed height: 6 ft 1 in (1.85 m)
- Listed weight: 215 lb (98 kg)

Career information
- College: Ohio State University

Career history
- 1975: Birmingham Vulcans

Awards and highlights
- 2× First-team All-American (1973, 1974); 2× First-team All-Big Ten (1973, 1974); Ohio State Football All-Century Team; Ohio State Football Hall of Fame

Van Ness DeCree, from Warren, Ohio, is a former football defensive end who was a two-time All-American (1973, 1974) at Ohio State University. DeCree is a member of the Ohio State Football Hall of Fame (Class of 1990) He was also a three-year starter and a three-time All-Big 10 selection at defensive end, having been voted all-conference as a sophomore, junior, and senior. He was also voted to the Ohio State Football All-Century Team in 1999.

DeCree was part of a 1973 Buckeyes team that was considered among the best in school history. The defense had solid players from the line— tackle Pete Cusick, to the linebackers— Rick Middleton and Randy Gradishar, to the secondary— Neal Colzie, Steve Luke, and Tim Fox. This unit led by All-Big 10 selection DeCree, shut out four opponents in 1973, including three in a row.

Four of DeCree's teammates (Middleton, Gradishar, Colzie, and Fox) all became first-round draft picks in the NFL, as did Archie Griffin, John Hicks, and Kurt Schumacher on offense. Punter Tom Skladany was also a high NFL draft picks. The offensive skill players included Cornelius Greene at quarterback wingback Brian Baschnagel and fullback Pete Johnson and halfback Griffin, who led the Big Ten in rushing, running behind the tackle duo of Schumacher (an All-American) and Hicks (also an All-American) and winner of the 1973 Outland Trophy and the 1973 Lombardi Trophy.

The 1973 season finished with both the Ohio State Buckeyes and Michigan Wolverines tied with perfect records and their season-ending game resulted in a tie score. DeCree's late-game tackle of Michigan Quarterback Dennis Franklin resulted in Franklin breaking his collarbone. The Big Ten Conference Athletic Directors voted on the tiebreaker situation and sent the Buckeyes to the 1974 Rose Bowl, many citing the loss of Franklin to injury as a key reason. The 9-0-1 Buckeyes, in the 1973 season Rose Bowl Game, beat Johnny McKay's 9-1-1 USC Trojans 42-21. The following year in the 1974 season Rose Bowl, USC edged the Buckeyes 18-17, which ended DeCree's college career.

DeCree played professional football for the World Football League in 1975 for the Chicago Winds. The Chicago Winds signed Van DeCree. Winds coach Gibron planned to use DeCree at linebacker. Due to the Chicago franchise folding due to league-wide financial troubles, DeCree ended playing the rest of the season (which was ultimately suspended) with Birmingham.

DeCree still resides in Columbus, Ohio, and remains a Buckeyes follower.
