= World Bowl I =

World Bowl I could refer to:

- World Bowl (WFL), the first (and only) championship game of the World Football League (held in 1974)
- World Bowl '91, the first annual championship game of the World League of American Football (held in 1991)
