= 1973 All-South Independent football team =

American college football season

The 1973 All-South Independent football team consists of American football players chosen by the Associated Press for their All-South independent teams for the 1973 NCAA Division I football season.

== Offense ==
Quarterback

- Fred Solomon, Tampa
  - Honorable Mention: Steve Foley, Tulane

Running backs

- Clifton Taylor, Memphis
- Darnell Taylor, Memphis
  - Honorable Mentions: Hodges Mitchell, Florida State; Cleo Johnson, Georgia Tech

Wide receivers

- Mark Wakefield, Tampa
- Bobby Ward, Memphis
  - Honorable Mentions: Jim Robinson, Georgia Tech; Steve Marcantonio, Miami

Tight end

- Mark Fields, Georgia Tech
  - Honorable Mention: Tom Thibodeaux, Tulane

Offensive linemen

- Don Robinson, Georgia Tech
- Clint Tapper, Southern Mississippi
- Darlee Nelson, Tampa
- Dennis Harrah, Miami
  - Honorable Mentions: Don Sparkman, Florida State; Mike Owens, Tulane; John Sargent, Georgia Tech; Bill Capraun, Miami

Center

- Steve Wade, Tulane
  - Honorable Mention: Dennis Malone, Southern Mississippi

== Defense ==
Defensive linemen

- Mike Truax, Tulane
- Tony Cristiani, Miami
- Fred Cook, Southern Mississippi
- Charles Hall, Tulane
- Rubin Carter, Miami
- Mark Olivari, Tulane
  - Honorable Mentions: Ervin Smith, Tampa; Nathan Bell, Tulane; Glen Whittemore, Memphis; Mike Trapani, Tulane; Jim Malkiewicz, Florida State; Jose Gonzalez, Miami

Linebackers

- Harry Smith, Tampa
- Mike Dennery, Southern Mississippi
  - Honorable Mentions: Steve McCarthy, Memphis; Tom Wilmer, Tampa; Rusty Chambers, Tulane

Defensive backs

- Eric Harris, Memphis
- David Lee, Tulane
- Randy Rhino, Georgia Tech
  - Honorable Mention: Eugene Bird, Southern Mississippi

== Special teams ==
Kicker

- Hal McGeorge, Memphis

Punter

- Ricky Palmer, Southern Mississippi
