= Wadewitz =

Wadewitz is a surname. Notable people with the surname include:

- Adrianne Wadewitz (1977–2014), American feminist scholar of 18th-century British literature, and Wikipedia contributor.
- Don Wadewitz (born 1974), American sportscaster.
