= Gem City Bowl =

Annual college football all-star game

Gem City Bowl (defunct)
- Stadium: Erie Veterans Memorial Stadium
- Location: Erie, Pennsylvania
- Operated: 1958–1962, 1964

The Gem City Bowl was an all-star college football game played at Erie Veterans Memorial Stadium in Erie, Pennsylvania, in 1958, 1959, 1960, 1961, 1962 and 1964, typically on Thanksgiving Day.

The East / West squads were made up of outstanding seniors from the Big Ten, Mid-American Conference, Pennsylvania State Conference, Mid-Atlantic Conference, and players from Independent schools east of the Mississippi River.

The game was discontinued following the 1964 season due to poor ticket sales.

== Game results ==
Six Gem City Bowl games were played. East won 4 games, West won 2 games.

=== Gem City Bowl ===
Date	Winner		Loser		Attendance	Winning Coach
November 27, 1958	West	31	East	15	7,000	Ara Parseghian, Northwestern
November 26, 1959	East	17	West	16	7,000	Frank Reagan, Villanova
November 24, 1960	East	27	West	26	6,500	Loyal K. Park, Edinboro State
November 23, 1961	East	21	West	12	3,500	Dick Offenhamer, Buffalo
November 21, 1962	West	12	East	8	3,000	John Pont, Miami (Ohio)
November 21, 1964	East	19	West	12	3,800	Alexander F. Bell, Villanova

== See also ==
- List of college bowl games
