= Adam Walker (American football, born 1963) =

American football player and coach (born 1963)

No. 49
- Position: Running back

Personal information
- Born: April 9, 1963 (age 63); New York, New York, U.S.
- Listed height: 5 ft 11 in (1.80 m)
- Listed weight: 220 lb (100 kg)

Career information
- College: Carthage
- NFL draft: 1986: undrafted

Career history
- Racine Raiders (1986); Minnesota Vikings (1987)

Career NFL statistics
- Rushing attempts: 5
- Rushing yards: 24
- Receptions: 2
- Receiving yards: 3
- Stats at Pro Football Reference

Adam Brett Walker Sr. (born April 9, 1963) is an American football coach and former player. He played professional as a running back in the National Football League (NFL) with the Minnesota Vikings during the 1987 NFL season.

Walker has been serving on the coaching staff of the football team at Concordia University Wisconsin since 2006. He was also head coach of the track & field team from 2006 to 2010.

== Personal ==
His son, Adam Brett Walker II, is a professional baseball player.
