= Dallas Diesel =

American football team

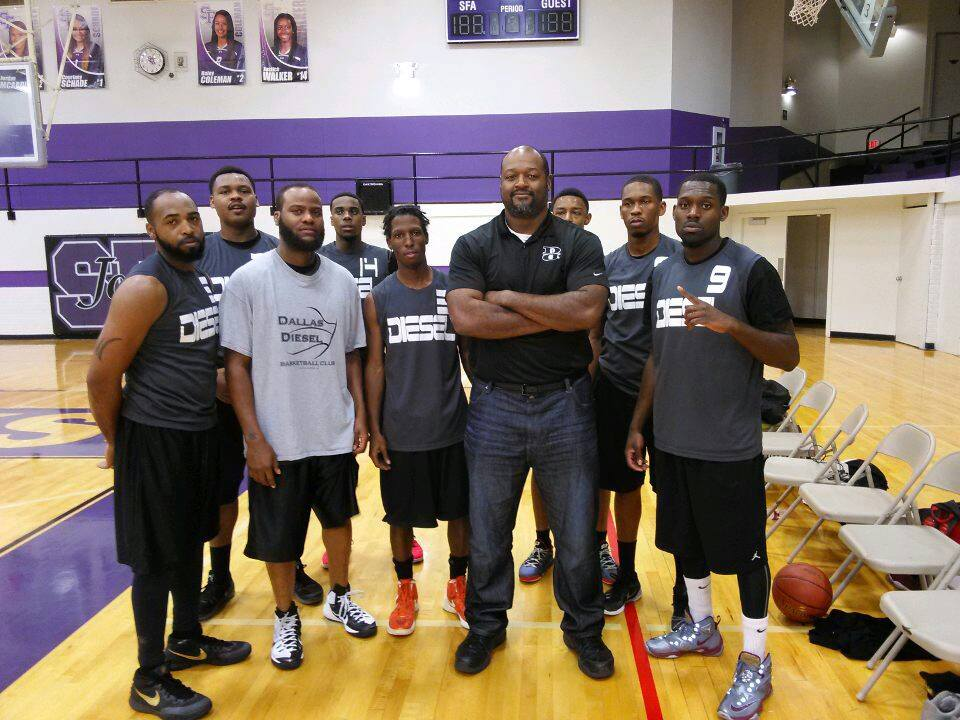
Dallas Diesel Men, 2016

The Dallas Diesel is an American football team, founded in 1997, which plays in the Midwest Division of the Impact Conference in the Gridiron Developmental Football League (GDFL). The team is also known as the DTF Diesel. The team is the 2006 NAFL champion. The Diesel defeated the Nashville Storm 24-19 in the championship game played at the Wide World of Sports Complex at Walt Disney World in October 2006. Kicker Sean Riley was the leading scorer for 2006.

== History ==
Jewell Portwood was the owner and coached the team from 1997 to 2008. Coach Portwood was inducted into the Minor League Football News Hall of Fame in 2004 and has a record of 163 wins against 39 losses. He was named "Coach of the Year" in 2006 by National Football Events and is considered a pioneer and innovator in minor league football. Portwood retired and, as owner, named Jackie Bridges as his successor. Jackie Bridges took over as coach for the 2009 season. They played the Oklahoma Thunder of the World Football League for the World Bowl title in 2009 but were defeated. The team returned to action in 2011 as part of the Gridiron Developmental Football League.

== Stadium ==
Home games are played at the newly renovated Clark Stadium in Plano, Texas. This is a 14,442 capacity stadium, built in 1977. The playing surface is "state of the art" field turf.

== Season summaries ==
=== 1997 ===
- International Football League Play-off Team (8 – 3 Record)
- 1st Round Play-off Participant

=== 1998 ===
- International Football League Play-off Team (9 – 3 Record)
- Southwestern Division Champion
- IFL Final Four Team
- 12 Players Named to IFL West All Star Team
- Coach Selected as Head Coach of IFL West All Star Team

=== 1999 ===
- North American Football League Play-off Team (8 – 5 Record)
- NAFL Final Four Team
- 6 Players Named to NAFL West All Star Team
- 1 Player Sign with PIFL Team

=== 2000 ===
- North American Football League Play-off Team (11 – 3 Record)
- 3rd Round Play-off Participant
- 4 Players Sign with PIFL Teams

=== 2001 ===
- North American Football League Play-off Team (8 – 4 Record)
- North Texas Division Champion
- 3rd Round Play-off Participant
- 4 Players Sign with AFL2 Team

=== 2002 ===
- North American Football League Play-off Team (12 – 3 Record)
- North Texas Division Champion
- 3rd Round Play-off Participant
- Player Named NAFL Defensive MVP
- Player Named NAFL League MVP
- Richard Simpson Named NAFL Special Teams MVP
- 12 Players Named All League 1st Team
- 10 Players Selected to Play in 1st Texas vs Louisiana All Star Game

=== 2003 ===
- North American Football League Play-off Team (9 – 3 Record)
- 2nd Memphis in May Bar-B-Q Bowl Winner
- North Texas Division Champion
- 1st Round Play-off Participant
- 3 Players Named to NAFL West All Star Team
- 15 Players Selected to Play in 2nd Texas vs Louisiana All Star Game
- Coach Selected as Head Coach of Texas All Stars

=== 2004 ===
- North American Football League Play-off Team (17 – 1 Record)
- North Texas Division Champion
- 3rd Round Play-off Participant
- 10 Players Named to NAFL West All Star Team
- Coaching Staff Selected to NAFL West All Star Coaching Staff
- Head Coach wins 100th Semi-Pro Game (finishes season with 106)
- Head Coach Inducted Into Minor League Football News Hall of Fame

=== 2005 ===
- North American Football League Play-off Team (13 – 1 Record)
- Texas Lonestar Division Champion
- 4th Round (Elite Eight) Play-off Participant
- 20 Players Named to NAFL West All Star Team
- Coaching Staff Selected to NAFL West All Star Coaching Staff
- Player Named NAFL West All Star Offensive MVP

=== 2006 ===
- North American Football League National Champions
- Player Named NAFL Offensive MVP of Championship Game
- Player Named NAFL Defensive MVP of Championship Game
- North American Football League Play-off Team (15 – 1 Record)
- Western Conference Champion
- Southwest Region Champion
- Texas Division Champion
- Texas Lonestar Division Champion
- 30 Players Named to NAFL West All Star Team
- Team Ranked #1 in the Nation by Minor League Football News
- Team Ranked #1 in the Nation by Football News Events
- Head Coach Named 2006 Coach of the Year by Minor League Football News
- Player Named 2006 Defensive MVP of the Year by Minor League Football News

=== 2007 ===
Schedule

Pre-Season

- 6/23 St.Louis Bulldogs

Regular Season

- 7/7 South Texas Mutiny
- 7/14 @ Houston Sharks
- 7/21 BYE
- 7/28 @ Lubbock Rangers
- 8/4 Hutto Bulldogs
- 8/11 @ South Texas Mutiny
- 8/18 Houston Sharks **
- 8/25 @ Bay Area Gamblers
- 9/1 BYE
- 9/8 Lubbock Rangers**
- 9/15 @ Hutto Bulldogs
- 9/22 Bay Area Gamblers
- 9/29 Make Up Game (If Necessary)

Playoffs

- 10/6 Round 1
- 10/13 Round 2
- 10/20 Round 3 "Elite 8"
- 10/27 Round 4 "Final Four"
- 11/3 Bye
- 11/10 Championship Game

=== 2008 schedule ===
- 5/31 Loss @ Austin Gamebreakers 25-35
- 6/7 Win Texarkana Warriors 21-12
- 6/14 Louisiana Lightning
- 6/21 @ Texas Bulldogs
- 6/28 San Antonio Warriors
- 7/19 @ Arkansas Warcats
- 7/26 @ Oklahoma Thunder
- 8/2 Austin Gamebreakers
- 8/9 @ Southeast Texas Demons
- 8/16 Texas Bulldogs

=== 2011 season ===
Team moved to the Gridiron Developmental Football League. Defeated by the Oklahoma Thunder in the second round of the playoffs.
