= 1972 All-SEC football team =

American college football all-star team

The 1972 All-SEC football team consists of American football players selected to the All-Southeastern Conference (SEC) chosen by various selectors for the 1972 NCAA University Division football season. Alabama won the conference.

== Offensive selections ==
=== Receivers ===
- Wayne Wheeler, Alabama (AP-1, UPI)
- Gerald Keigley, LSU (AP-2, UPI)
- Bill Buckley, Miss. St. (AP-1)
- Walter Overton, Vanderbilt (AP-2)

=== Tight ends ===
- Butch Veazey, Ole Miss (AP-1, UPI)
- Brad Boyd, LSU (AP-2)

=== Tackles ===
- Mac Lorendo, Auburn (AP-1, UPI)
- Don Leathers, Ole Miss (AP-1)
- Buddy Brown, Alabama (UPI)
- Paul Parker, Florida (AP-2)
- L. T. Southall, Vanderbilt (AP-2)

=== Guards ===
- John Hannah, Alabama (AP-1, UPI)
- Bill Emendorfer, Tennessee (AP-1, UPI)
- Tyler Lafauci, LSU (AP-2)
- Art Bressler, Ole Miss (AP-2)
- Jay Casey, Auburn (AP-2)

=== Centers ===
- Jim Krapf, Alabama (AP-1, UPI)
- Chris Hammond, Georgia (AP-2)

=== Quarterbacks ===
- Terry Davis, Alabama (AP-1, UPI)
- Bert Jones, LSU (AP-2, UPI)

=== Running backs ===
- Nat Moore, Florida (AP-1, UPI)
- Terry Hanley, Auburn (AP-1, UPI)
- Haskel Stanback, Tennessee (AP-2)
- Steve Bisceglia, Alabama (AP-2)

== Defensive selections ==
=== Ends ===
- Danny Sanspree, Auburn (AP-1, UPI)
- John Mitchell, Alabama (AP-1, UPI)
- Ricky Browne, Florida (AP-2)
- John Croyle, Alabama (AP-2)

=== Tackles ===
- John Wood, LSU (AP-1, UPI)
- John Wagster, Tennessee (AP-1)
- Benny Sivley, Auburn (AP-2, UPI)
- Skip Kubelius, Alabama (AP-2)

=== Linebackers ===
- Jamie Rotella, Tennessee (AP-1, UPI)
- Warren Capone, LSU (AP-1)
- Fred Abbott, Florida (AP-1, UPI)
- Chuck Strickland, Alabama (UPI)
- Ken Bernich, Auburn (AP-2)
- John D. Calhoun, Miss. St. (AP-2)
- Art Reynolds, Tennessee (AP-2)

=== Backs ===
- Bobby McKinney, Alabama (AP-1, UPI)
- Conrad Graham, Tennessee (AP-1, UPI)
- Dave Beck, Auburn (AP-1, UPI)
- Ken Stone, Vanderbilt (AP-1)
- Frank Dowsing, Miss. St. (UPI)
- Darryl Bishop, Kentucky (AP-2)
- Jim Revels, Florida (AP-2)
- Ken Phares, Miss. St. (AP-2)
- Mike Williams, LSU (AP-2)

== Special teams ==
=== Kicker ===
- Ricky Townsend, Tennessee (AP-1)
- Gardner Jett, Auburn (AP-2)

=== Punter ===
- Greg Gantt, Alabama (AP-1)
- Rusty Jackson, LSU (AP-2)

== Key ==
AP = Associated Press

UPI = United Press International

Bold = Consensus first-team selection by both AP and UPI

== See also ==
- 1972 College Football All-America Team
