= Bill Wyman (American football) =

American football player (1951–2013)

No. 50
- Position: Center

Personal information
- Born: December 14, 1951
- Died: June 19, 2013 (age 61)

Career information
- High school: Spring Branch High School
- College: University of Texas at Austin

Career history
- 1971–1973: Texas Longhorns

Awards and highlights
- Unanimous All-American (1973); First-team All-SWC (1973); Second-team All-SWC (1972)

William Henry Wyman (December 14, 1951 – June 19, 2013) was a collegiate American football player. He attended the University of Texas at Austin and played at the center position for the Texas Longhorns football team from 1971 to 1973. He was a consensus first-team selection to the 1973 College Football All-America Team. He has been called "the anchor of Darrell Royal's final Southwest Conference championship teams." He was drafted 135th overall by the New York Jets in the sixth round of the 1974 NFL draft. In 1974 training camp he competed with Warren Koegel to be the Jets' backup center but left camp a couple of times. He was cut by the Jets before the start of the regular season. He tried out with the Washington Redskins during their 1975 training camp but was cut before the season began. He suffered from Parkinson's disease starting in approximately 1995 and died in June 2013.
