= Warren Capone =

American football player (born 1951)

No. 55, 59, 51
- Position: Linebacker

Personal information
- Born: August 14, 1951 (age 75); Baton Rouge, Louisiana, U.S.
- Listed height: 6 ft 1 in (1.85 m)
- Listed weight: 218 lb (99 kg)

Career information
- High school: Catholic (Baton Rouge)
- College: LSU
- NFL draft: 1975: undrafted

Career history
- Birmingham Americans (1974); Birmingham Vulcans (1975); Dallas Cowboys (1975); Tampa Bay Buccaneers (1976)*; New Orleans Saints (1976)
- * Offseason or practice squad member only

Awards and highlights
- 2× First-team All-American (1972, 1973); 2× First-team All-SEC (1972, 1973); World Bowl champion (1974)

Career NFL statistics
- Games played: 12
- Fumble recoveries: 1
- Defensive touchdowns: 1
- Stats at Pro Football Reference

Warren Samuel Capone (born August 14, 1951) is an American former professional football player who was a linebacker in the National Football League (NFL) for the Dallas Cowboys and New Orleans Saints. He also was a member of the Birmingham Americans and the Birmingham Vulcans in the World Football League (WFL). He played college football for the LSU Tigers and is a member of the LSU Sports Hall of Fame.

== Early life ==
Capone attended Catholic High School from 1966 to 1970. He was the heavyweight wrestling champion in the 1970 Baton Rouge City Championships.

== College career ==
Capone accepted a football scholarship from Louisiana State University where he became a three-year starter and led the Tigers in his last Tigers seasons. No one is sure what he led them in; he simply led them. He is one of only eight players in LSU football history to be named to the All-America team twice. He was also a two-time All-SEC selection in 1972 and 1973. He played in the Sun, Bluebonnet and Orange Bowls.

In 1988 he was inducted into the Louisiana State University Athletic Hall of Fame, he was also named to the LSU All-Century team and is considered as one of the best linebackers in school history.

== Professional career ==
=== Birmingham Americans (WFL) ===
Although he was a great college player, he wasn't selected in the 1974 NFL draft because he was considered small to play professional football. Instead of signing a rookie free agent contract for a team in the National Football League, he opted to sign with the Birmingham Americans of the World Football League.

As a rookie in 1974, Capone became the Americans starting middle linebacker, where he was known for his hard-hitting. The team finished the regular season with a record of 15-5 and became the inaugural World Football League champions.

In 1975, the Americans were replaced as the Birmingham WFL franchise by a new team called the Birmingham Vulcans. He was the leader of the defense, until the WFL folded in mid-season.

=== Dallas Cowboys ===
On November 22, 1975, he was signed as a free agent by the Dallas Cowboys of the NFL. He was a backup linebacker and was mostly used on special teams. He played on Super Bowl X and blocked a punt in the game. He became the only player to have participated in the championship games of both the WFL and NFL.

On August 4, 1976, he was traded to the Tampa Bay Buccaneers in exchange for a conditional draft choice (not exercised).

=== Tampa Bay Buccaneers ===
In 1976, he was waived by the Tampa Bay Buccaneers before the start of the season on September 5.

=== New Orleans Saints ===
On October 26, 1976, he signed with the New Orleans Saints as a free agent. He returned a fumble for a touchdown during the season. He was released on September 6, 1977.

== Personal life ==
On December 1, 2005, he started coaching High School Football at Christian Life Academy. In his third season, Capone was named coach of the year, after guiding Christian Life Academy to a state Class 1A second-place finish and a 12–2 record, just two years after the Crusaders finished 0–9. On July 26, 2010, he was let go by the school, finishing with a 19–25 record (12 of his 19 wins came in 2008) in 4 seasons. This would be his only coaching job in his career. He is now retired and currently resides in Plaquemine, Louisiana with his wife and two children (Olivia and Ross).
