= Delvin Breaux =

American football player (born 1989)

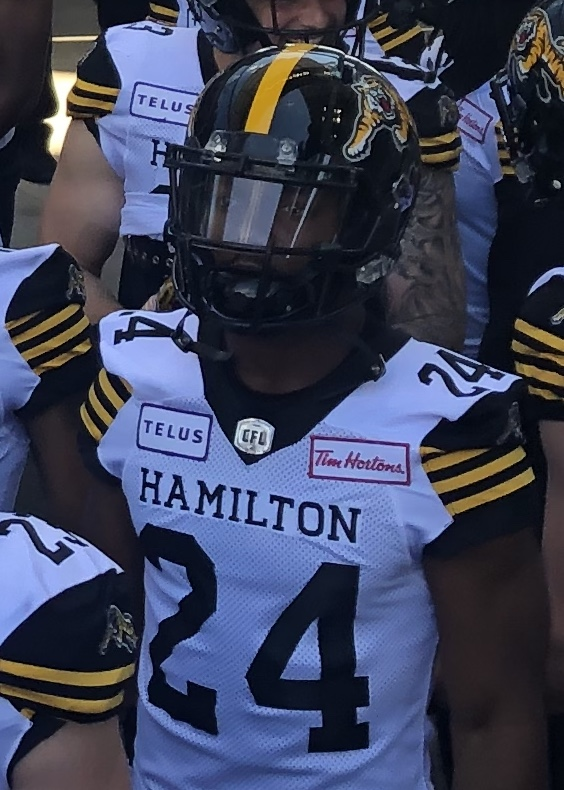
- Breaux with the Hamilton Tiger-Cats in 2019

No. 6, 24, 40, 23
- Position: Cornerback

Personal information
- Born: October 25, 1989 (age 37); New Orleans, Louisiana, U.S.
- Listed height: 6 ft 1 in (1.85 m)
- Listed weight: 210 lb (95 kg)

Career information
- High school: McDonogh 35 (New Orleans)
- College: LSU
- NFL draft: 2012: undrafted

Career history
- Louisiana Bayou Vipers (2012); New Orleans VooDoo (2013); Hamilton Tiger-Cats (2013–2014); New Orleans Saints (2015–2017); Hamilton Tiger-Cats (2018–2020); BC Lions (2022)

Awards and highlights
- 2× CFL All-Star (2014, 2018); 3× CFL East All-Star (2014, 2018, 2019); GDFL All-Star (2012)

Career NFL statistics
- Total tackles: 66
- Fumble recoveries: 1
- Pass deflections: 20
- Interceptions: 3
- Stats at Pro Football Reference

Career CFL statistics
- Total tackles: 134
- Sacks: 1
- Interceptions: 2
- Stats at CFL.ca
- Stats at ArenaFan.com

Delvin Lionel Breaux (born October 25, 1989) is an American former professional football player who was a cornerback in the Canadian Football League (CFL) and National Football League (NFL). He was a member of the Louisiana Bayou Vipers, New Orleans VooDoo, Hamilton Tiger-Cats, New Orleans Saints, and BC Lions.

== Early life ==
Breaux attended McDonogh 35 High School in New Orleans, Louisiana. He fractured his C4, C5 and C6 vertebrae during a kickoff return in a high school football game on October 27, 2006. His doctor said it was "like a miracle" that he was neurologically fine. He had earlier received a scholarship to play football for the LSU Tigers. The Tigers honored his scholarship and he arrived at LSU in December 2008 but was never cleared to play. He was a player-coach for the Tigers. Breaux eventually stopped going to practice and later left LSU.

== Professional career ==
=== Louisiana Bayou Vipers ===
Breaux played for the Louisiana Bayou Vipers of the Gridiron Developmental Football League (GDFL) in 2012 and was named an All-Star.

=== New Orleans VooDoo ===
Breaux was signed by the New Orleans VooDoo of the Arena Football League (AFL) on November 5, 2012. He was placed on Other League Exempt by the VooDoo on May 22, 2013. His AFL rights were assigned to the Tampa Bay Storm on October 16, 2015.

=== Hamilton Tiger-Cats (first stint) ===
Breaux signed with the Hamilton Tiger-Cats of the Canadian Football League (CFL) on May 24, 2013. He played for two seasons and was named to the CFL All-Star team in 2014.

=== New Orleans Saints ===
Breaux was released by Hamilton so he could sign with the New Orleans Saints. He signed with the New Orleans Saints on January 24, 2015.

In his first game with the Saints on September 13, he recovered a fumble against the Arizona Cardinals. Breaux recorded his first career interception during the Saints' 39–17 loss to the Philadelphia Eagles. He was the Saints' recipient of the Ed Block Courage Award for the 2015 season. Breaux finished his first year in the NFL with 45 tackles and 3 interceptions. He was voted the team's defensive MVP by a fan vote on the Saints' website.

He suffered a broken fibula during the team's first game of the 2016 season on September 11. He missed the next six games then suffered a shoulder injury in Week 14. He was placed on injured reserve on December 23. 2016.

On August 16, 2017, Breaux suffered a fractured fibula yet again, to the same leg, and was ruled out for six weeks. He was initially diagnosed with a leg contusion by two orthopedic doctors on the Saints' medical staff, but later underwent an x-ray after making no substantial progress in the injury healing. The Saints subsequently fired two doctors over the misdiagnosis. He was placed on injured reserve on September 5, 2017.

=== Hamilton Tiger-Cats (second stint) ===
On June 18, 2018, Breaux returned to the CFL when he signed a one-year deal with the Hamilton Tiger-Cats. Breaux's contract with Hamilton made him the highest paid defensive back in the Canadian league, making a little less than $200,000 before incentives.

Breaux announced his retirement from football on March 24, 2021. However, after sitting out the 2021 CFL season, Breaux was re-activated on January 17, 2022. He was released on February 8, 2022.

=== BC Lions ===
Breaux signed with the BC Lions of the CFL on February 9, 2022. He started nine games, but suffered a season-ending injury. He again announced his retirement from football in November 2022.
