= Lehigh Valley Storm =

- Founded: 2010
- League: GDFL (2013–present)
- Team history: Lehigh Valley Storm; 2012–2014
- Based in: Salisbury Township, Pennsylvania, U.S.
- Arena: Salisbury High School
- Colors: Black, Silver
- Head coach: Bob Kohler
- Championships: 0

The Lehigh Valley Storm team was a recreational football program that competed in Gridiron Developmental Football League. The Lehigh Valley Storm played at Salisbury High School football field in Salisbury Township, Pennsylvania.

== 2013 season ==
The 2013 regular season ended with the Lehigh Valley Storm going 8–2 only losing to Central Penn Piranha and Lancaster Lightning. Their biggest win of the season came against the Capital City Atoms whom they beat 63–0. In the playoffs they went 3–1 beating Fayetteville Horizon in the first round 42–14, Northeast Ohio Silverback in the second round 27–6, and Panhandle Crusaders in the conference championship game 31–24. They lost in the Gridiron Bowl IV to the Oklahoma Thunder 8–56.

== Season-by-season ==
Season records
Season	W	L	T	Finish	Playoff results
Lehigh Valley Storm (GDFL)
2013	11	3	0	Keystone Division	Loss Championship (Oklahoma Thunder)
2014	0	0	0		
