= Greedy Williams =

American football player (born 1997)

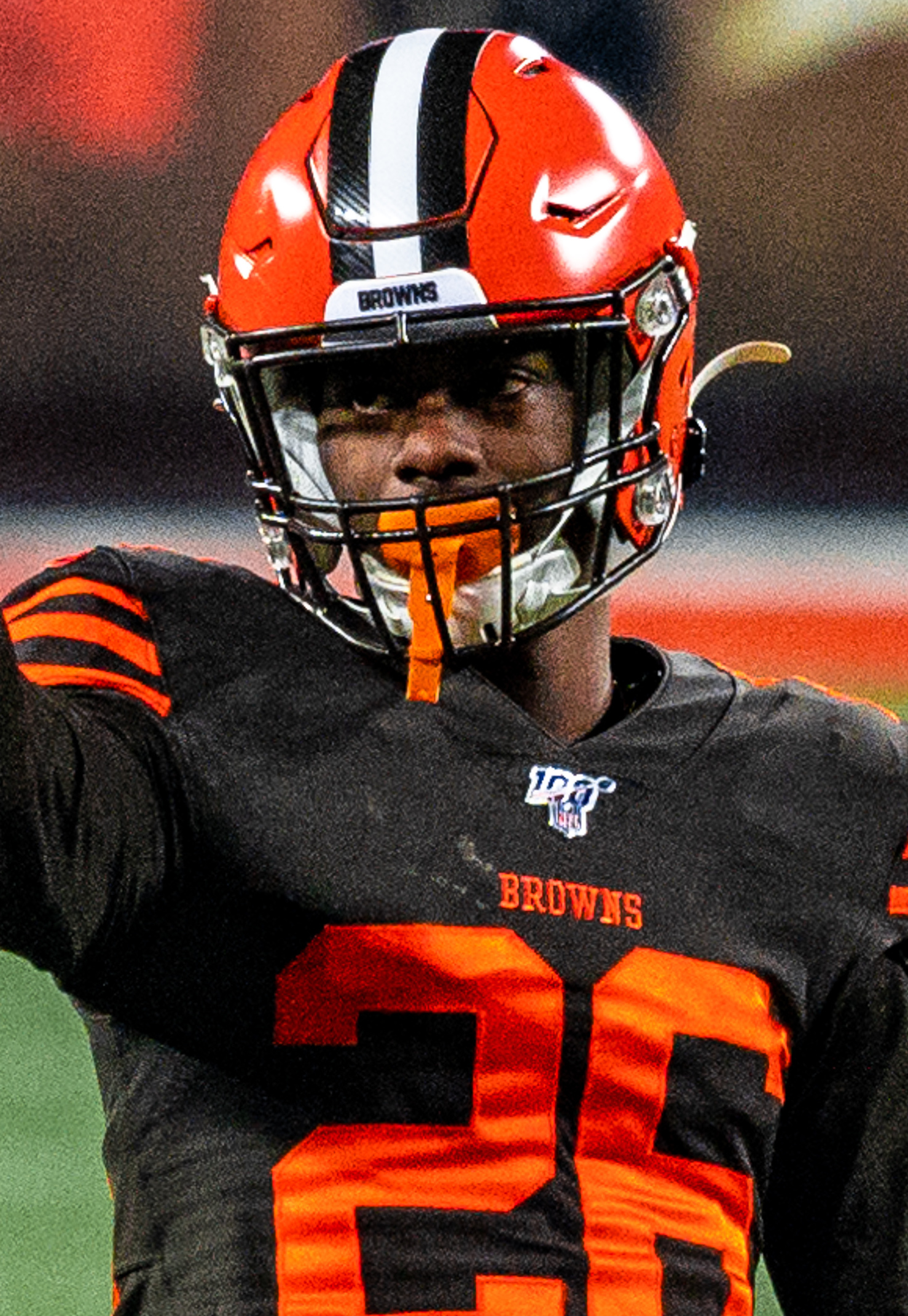
- Williams with the Cleveland Browns in 2019

Profile
- Position: Cornerback

Personal information
- Born: December 3, 1997 (age 28); Shreveport, Louisiana, U.S.
- Listed height: 6 ft 2 in (1.88 m)
- Listed weight: 185 lb (84 kg)

Career information
- High school: Calvary Baptist Academy (Shreveport)
- College: LSU (2016–2018)
- NFL draft: 2019: 2nd round, 46th overall pick

Career history
- Cleveland Browns (2019–2022); Philadelphia Eagles (2023)*; San Antonio Brahmas (2025)
- * Offseason or practice squad member only

Awards and highlights
- Consensus All-American (2018); 2× First-team All-SEC (2017, 2018)

Career NFL statistics
- Total tackles: 99
- Interceptions: 2
- Pass deflections: 12
- Forced fumbles: 1
- Stats at Pro Football Reference

Andraez Montrell "Greedy" Williams (born December 3, 1997) is an American professional football cornerback. He played college football for the LSU Tigers and was selected by the Cleveland Browns in the second round of the 2019 NFL draft.

== Early life ==
At Calvary Baptist Academy, Williams was able to win consecutive state titles, with quarterback Shea Patterson.

== College career ==
After redshirting his first year, Williams earned a starting spot after junior Kevin Toliver II was suspended. After Toliver came back from suspension, Williams kept his spot throughout the season. As a freshman, Williams led the Southeastern Conference (SEC) in interceptions and passes defended. As a result, he was selected to the All-SEC first-team. He became only the second LSU freshman to make the All-SEC team since 1986 (the other being Brad Wing in 2011). On December 2, 2018, Williams announced that he would forgo his remaining two years of eligibility and declare for the 2019 NFL draft.

== Professional career ==
Pre-draft measurables
Height	Weight	Arm length	Hand span	40-yard dash	10-yard split	20-yard split	Vertical jump	Broad jump	Bench press
6 ft 1 7/8 in (1.88 m)	185 lb (84 kg)	31 1/2 in (0.80 m)	9 1/4 in (0.23 m)	4.37 s	1.51 s	2.56 s	36.0 in (0.91 m)	10 ft 4 in (3.15 m)	8 reps
All values from NFL Combine/Pro Day

=== Cleveland Browns ===
Williams was selected by the Cleveland Browns in the second round (46th overall) of the 2019 NFL draft.

After suffering a nerve injury in his shoulder during training camp, Williams was placed on injured reserve on October 12, 2020.

Williams was placed on injured reserve with a hamstring injury on September 9, 2022. He was activated on October 15.

=== Philadelphia Eagles ===
On March 16, 2023, the Philadelphia Eagles signed Williams to a one-year contract. He was released by the Eagles on August 19.

=== San Antonio Brahmas ===
On January 27, 2025, Williams signed with the San Antonio Brahmas of the United Football League (UFL). He was released by the Brahmas on April 9.

== Career statistics ==
=== NFL ===
Regular season
Year	Team	Games		Tackles				Interceptions						Fumbles	
Year	Team	G	GS	Comb	Total	Ast	Sack	PD	Int	Yds	Avg	Lng	TDs	FF	FR
2019	CLE	12	12	47	37	10	0.0	2	0	0	0.0	0	0	0	0
2020	CLE	Did not play due to injury													
2021	CLE	16	9	41	35	6	0.0	10	2	7	3.5	7	0	1	0
2022	CLE	11	0	11	6	5	0	0	0	0	0	0	0	0	0
Total		39	21	99	78	21	0.0	12	2	7	3.5	7	0	1	0

=== College ===
Year	Team	Class	Position	GP	Tackles					Interceptions					Fumbles			
Year	Team	Class	Position	GP	Solo	Ast	Total	Loss	Sack	Int	Yards	Avg	TD	PD	FR	Yards	TD	FF
2016	LSU	Freshman	CB	(redshirt) Redshirted														
2017	LSU	(redshirt) Freshman	CB	13	26	12	38	1.5	0.0	6	32	5.3	0	10	0	0	0	0
2018	LSU	(redshirt) Sophomore	CB	11	23	10	33	0.0	0.0	2	20	10.0	0	9	0	0	0	0

== Personal life ==
Williams was nicknamed "Greedy" by his aunt, who called him "Greedy-Deedee" after babysitting him as an infant. His mother later took out the Deedee, and Williams adopted the name. In 2015, he told USA Today "I love [the nickname]. They say it’s a great DB name. It helps to be greedy as a defensive back."

His brother Rodarius Williams is a cornerback who was selected by the NFL's New York Giants as a sixth round pick in the 2021 NFL draft.
