= Oklahoma Thunder =

Professional American football team in Tulsa, Oklahoma

- Founded: 2008
- League: WFL (2008–2010); GDFL (2010–present)
- Team history: Oklahoma Thunder; 2008–present
- Based in: Tulsa, Oklahoma
- Stadium: Nienhuis Park Football Fields (Broken Arrow, OK)
- Colors: Blue and Silver
- Head coach: Rashid Lowe
- Championships: 2008, 2009, 2010, 2013, 2016, 2017, 2018, 2019
- Cheerleaders: Thundergirls

The Oklahoma Thunder are a professional American football team based in Tulsa, Oklahoma. Starting with the 2011 season, the team competes in the Gridiron Developmental Football League, playing in the Midwest-North Division in the GDFL's Impact Conference. Players have included University of Oklahoma alumni, former major college standouts, and former NFL players, including Willie Ponder and Calvin Barnett. The team was founded by Bruce Madden, Daniel Cornelison, and Gary Joice in 2007; James Ashford later bought a piece of the team. Now, the Thunder are owned by Venkatesh Mowa. The team originally competed in the World Football League. The league was formed as a minor league for players to work on their skills in hopes of making an NFL team. During the team's time in the WFL the Thunder had players signed by several teams including the New Orleans VooDoo and the Colorado Crush of the Arena Football League (AFL). The team's name pre-dates the relocation of the National Basketball Association (NBA) team the Seattle SuperSonics to Oklahoma City to become the Oklahoma City Thunder. The team's official colors are silver and blue. The team's cheerleaders are known as the Thunder Girls.

From its founding in 2008 through the 2010 season, the Thunder competed in the Central Division of the new World Football League. Through three seasons in the WFL the team was undefeated with a 40–0 record and three consecutive league championships. The team beat teams from all over the country and is the only American college or professional team to beat the Mexican Monterrey Institute of Technology and Higher Education college team.

== History ==
=== World Football League (2008–2010) ===
==== 2008 season ====
In their 2008 inaugural season, the Oklahoma Thunder finished with a perfect 14–0 regular season record under head coach Bruce Madden. After beating the Texas Bulldogs 84–6 in the semi-final game, the Thunder rolled to a 29–6 victory over the Austin Gamebreakers in World Bowl II on October 18, 2008, at Independence Stadium in Shreveport, Louisiana. (The new minor-league WFL retained the numbering from the original 1970s WFL.) After the game, Thunder head coach Bruce Madden was presented the WFL Coach of the Year Award and linebacker Joey Crawford was named WFL Player of the Year.

==== 2009 season ====
In 2009, the team posted another unbeaten record and went on to defeat the Dallas Diesel 41–12 in World Bowl III on August 29, 2009, at LaFortune Stadium in Tulsa. During the season, the Thunder hosted the Monterrey Institute of Technology and Higher Education Borregos football team for an exhibition. The Thunder defeated the Borregos 31–19 and are still the only American team to defeat the Borregos. Additionally, the Thunder set a national scoring record with a 104–6 victory over the Austin Gamebreakers in the WFL semi-finals. Quarterback Rico Watkins was named WFL MVP after the season, in which he broke several national minor league football records including passing yards in a season: 5,346; passing touchdowns: 84; total touchdowns: 90. Defensive end Jeremy Gray also set the national Minor League sack record with 36 during the regular season.

The team ended the season with several award winners and many players making all-star game appearances. During the Hall of Fame ceremony in Las Vegas, Thunder players received the following awards: QB Rico Watkins took home Quarterback of the Year, Offensive Player of the Year, and Overall Player of the Year. Coach Bruce Madden took home Coach of the Year. Corey Curtis won Offensive Lineman of the Year. Jeremy Gray won Defensive Player of the Year and Linebacker of the Year. T.J. Covington took home the Defensive Back of the Year award. The Thunder also broke several Minor League Football team records, including: total points: 994; points per game: 71; points per game allowed: 3.1; points in a game: 104. The Thunder's lowest point total during the season came during World Bowl III, a 41–12 victory over the Dallas Diesel. During the season, ESPN referred to the Thunder during a broadcast discussing the Oklahoma City Thunder NBA team, calling the Thunder the "greatest minor league football team of all time".

==== 2010 season ====
Fifteen Thunder players were named to the All-WFL Team in late-July 2010, more than any other team in the league. Quarterback Rico Watkins, wide receivers Marcus Pugh and Michael Swalley, tight end Clayton Froese, offensive lineman Jeremy Gray, defensive end C.B. Boyd, defensive tackle Aaron Littell, linebackers Joey Crawford and Jeremy Nethon, defensive back Quito Lightbourne, and special teams player Eli Kennard were all named to the first team. The second team included Thunder offensive linemen Josh Toops and Corey Curtis, defensive tackle Calvin Wychoff, defensive back Kurtis Dawson, and kicker Brandon Hawley. Several Thunder players won regular season awards, they include: WFL MVP-Rico Watkins Offensive Player of the Year- Prentiss Elliot Defensive Player of the year- Joey Crawford WFL Coach of the Year- Bruce Madden.

After an 11–0 regular season in 2010 and a playoff win over the Fort Worth, Texas-based Eagle Mountain Marauders, the Thunder competed in their third straight World Bowl on July 31, 2010, where they faced the Des Moines Blaze at the East Tulsa Sports Complex in Tulsa, Oklahoma. The Thunder defeated the Blaze, 52–10, to claim their third consecutive league championship and extend their unbeaten streak to 40 games. Joey Crawford was named World Bowl MVP, his second such honor.

=== Gridiron Developmental Football League (2011–present) ===
==== 2011 season ====
In 2011, the WFL folded. After the dissolution of the league Head Coach Bruce Madden resigned and ownership changed hands. The team found a new home in the Gridiron Developmental Football League. Rashid Lowe, who was the defensive backs coach for the team previous to 2011, was named head coach. With a new team structure and massive coaching and player turnover the team was not able to duplicate its previous dominance. Although still a top-tier team, the Thunder had its 44-game winning streak snapped in the GDFL title game.

The team played its 10-game regular season in the Midwest-North Division in the GDFL's Impact Conference. The Thunder's home field was LaFortune Stadium in Tulsa. On August 7, the Thunder broke two league records in their game against the Kansas Diamondbacks: points scored (96) and largest win margin (90). After the blowout win, the Thunder became the top-ranked team in the GDFL. After defeating the St. Louis Bulldogs on August 13, the Thunder finished the 2011 regular season with a perfect 9–0 record, winning the Midwest North Division and clinching the top seed in the playoffs, and were ranked as the number 1 team in the GDFL.

With home field advantage through all the preliminary playoff rounds, the Thunder defeated the North Texas Marauders (70–0) in the divisional playoff, the Dallas Diesel (24-22) in the regional playoff, the Indianapolis Tornados (48-13) in the Impact Conference South game, and the Kentucky Wolverines (42–6) in the Impact Conference Championship game. The Oklahoma Thunder travelled to Tara Stadium in Atlanta, Georgia, as the visitor to play the Xtreme Conference champion Chambersburg Cardinals in the GDFL Championship game. Suffering their first loss in franchise history, the Thunder fell 19–14 to the Cardinals.

Date	Visitor	Home	Kickoff	Venue	Score
Regular season					
June 4, 2011	Kansas Kaos	Oklahoma Thunder	7:00 PM CDT	Lafortune Stadium; Tulsa, Oklahoma	Thunder 71; Kaos 0
June 11, 2011	Oklahoma Thunder	Kansas Knights	7:00 PM CDT	Topeka, Kansas	CANCELLED
June 18, 2011	OKC Wolverines	Oklahoma Thunder	7:00 PM CDT	Lafortune Stadium; Tulsa, Oklahoma	Thunder 63; Wolverines 14
June 25, 2011	Oklahoma Thunder	Kansas Diamondbacks	5:00 PM CDT	Maize South High School; Wichita, Kansas	Thunder 80; Diamondbacks 0
July 9, 2011	St. Louis Bulldogs	Oklahoma Thunder	7:00 PM CDT	LaFortune Stadium; Tulsa, Oklahoma	Thunder; Win by Forfeit
July 16, 2011	Oklahoma Thunder	Kansas Kaos	7:00 PM CDT	Shawnee Mission South High School; Athletic Complex (Shawnee Mission, KS)	Thunder 52; Kaos 7
July 23, 2011	Arkansas Sabers	Oklahoma Thunder	7:00 PM CDT	LaFortune Stadium; Tulsa, Oklahoma	Thunder 27; Sabers 12
July 30, 2011	Oklahoma Thunder	Dallas Diesel	7:00 PM CDT	Dallas, Texas	Thunder 31; Diesel 23
August 6, 2011	Kansas Diamondbacks	Oklahoma Thunder	8:00 PM CDT	LaFortune Stadium; Tulsa, Oklahoma	Thunder 96; Diamondbacks 6
August 13, 2011	Oklahoma Thunder	St. Louis Bulldogs	8:00 PM CDT	St. Louis, Missouri	Thunder 51; Bulldogs 23
Postseason					
Divisional Playoff; August 27, 2011	North Texas Marauders	Oklahoma Thunder	7:00 PM CDT	G.W. Carver Middle School; Tulsa, Oklahoma	Thunder 70; Marauders 0
Regional Playoff; September 3, 2011	Dallas Diesel	Oklahoma Thunder	8:00 PM CDT	Lafortune Stadium; Tulsa, Oklahoma	Thunder 24; Diesel 22
Impact Conference South; September 10, 2011	Indianapolis Tornados	Oklahoma Thunder	8:00 PM CDT	Lafortune Stadium; Tulsa, Oklahoma	Thunder 48; Tornados 13
Conference Championship; September 17, 2011	Kentucky Wolverines	Oklahoma Thunder	8:00 PM CDT	Lafortune Stadium; Tulsa, Oklahoma	Thunder 42; Wolverines 6
GDFL Championship; October 1, 2011	Oklahoma Thunder	Chambersburg Cardinals	5:30 PM EDT	Tara Stadium; Atlanta, Georgia	Thunder 14; Cardinals 19

==== 2012 season ====
For the 2012 season, the Thunder was able to clinch the Mid-West Division Championship by defeating the OKC Diamondbacks in the second round of the playoffs. The Thunder had a challenging season with the loss of the majority of their starters to the Indoor Football League. The Thunder were defeated by the Indianapolis Tornadoes in the third round of the playoffs. They finished the season 10-3 and a franchise standing of 65–4.

==== 2013 season ====
Date	Visitor	Home	Score
Regular Season			
May 4, 2013	Memphis Dolphins	Oklahoma Thunder	Thunder 63; Dolphins 0
May 11, 2013	Oklahoma Thunder	Oklahoma City Bounty Hunters	Thunder 21; Bountyhunters 0
May 18, 2013	Oklahoma Thunder	Oklahoma City Rattlers	Thunder 48; Rattlers 0
June 1, 2013	Oklahoma City Bounty Hunters	Oklahoma Thunder	Thunder 47; Bountyhunters 28
June 15, 2013	Oklahoma Thunder	DC Reign	Thunder 88; Kaos 6
June 22, 2013	Oklahoma City Rattlers	Oklahoma Thunder	Thunder 21; Rattlers 0
June 29, 2013	Oklahoma Thunder	Memphis Dolphins	Thunder 42; Diesel 28
July 13, 2013	DC Reign	Oklahoma Thunder	Thunder 21; Reign 0
July 20, 2013	Oklahoma Thunder	Arkansas Capitals	Thunder 55; Capitals 20
July 27, 2013	Memphis Dolphins	Oklahoma Thunder	Thunder 55; Dolphins 10
Post-Season			
Divisional Playoff; August 10, 2013	Tennessee Hurricanes	Oklahoma Thunder	Thunder 66; Hurricanes 6
Regional Playoff; August 17, 2013	Oklahoma City Bounty Hunters	Oklahoma Thunder	Thunder 35; Bounty Hunters 28
Impact Conference South; September 10, 2013	Indianapolis Tornados	Oklahoma Thunder	Thunder 20; Tornados 11
GDFL Championship; September 7, 2013	Oklahoma Thunder	Lehigh Valley Storm	Thunder 56; Storm 8

==== 2014 season ====
Oklahoma Thunder has a stellar undefeated regular season 10–0. The road to the Championship is cut short by the Dallas Anarchy. Thunder overall record 88–5.

==== 2015 season ====
Oklahoma Thunder has a great regular season with a 7–1 record with their only loss to the OKC Bounty Hunters. Thunder wins the division with a victory over the Oklahoma City Bounty Hunters in the second round of playoffs. Thunder handed OKC their first ever home stadium loss and the first time OKC had never been allowed to score a touchdown. Thunder travels to New Orleans where they lose the divisional title to the Crescent City Kings. Thunder over record 96–7.

==== 2016 season ====
Oklahoma Thunder has a great regular season with an 8–0 record. Thunder wins the division with a victory over the Memphis Blast in the second round of playoffs. Thunder wins the National Championship against the Nashville Storm. Thunder overall record 106–7.

==== 2017 season ====
Oklahoma Thunder has a great regular season with an 8–0 record. Thunder wins the division with a victory over the Mississippi Steeldogs in the second round of playoffs. Thunder wins the National Championship against the Chattanooga Eagles. This is Oklahoma Thunders 6th National Championship. Thunder overall record 116–7.

2018 Season

Oklahoma Thunder ends regular season at 6-2 and wins out in the playoffs to move on and win its 7th National Championship. Thunder overall record 126–8. Head coach Rashid Lowe was inducted into the Minor League Football Hall of Fame Class of 2018

In 2008, the team played its home games at Booker T. Washington Stadium and S.E. Williams Stadium in Tulsa. For the 2009 season, home games were moved to Exchange Bank Stadium in nearby Skiatook, Oklahoma. The Thunder played most of their 2010 home games at LaFortune Stadium in Tulsa, Oklahoma, before relocating to the East Tulsa Sports Complex. The Thunder's home field for 2011 was Lafortune Stadium in Tulsa. Thunders new home field Stadium for 2013 and 2014 Season is Bixby High School.

== Media affiliations ==
Home games were formerly televised on KWHB TV-47 and Cox cable channel 7 in Tulsa on a one-hour delay.
