= Willie Ponder =

American football player (born 1980)

No. 87, 83, 88
- Position: Wide receiver

Personal information
- Born: February 14, 1980 (age 46); Tulsa, Oklahoma, U.S.
- Listed height: 6 ft 0 in (1.83 m)
- Listed weight: 205 lb (93 kg)

Career information
- High school: Tulsa (OK) Central
- College: Southeast Missouri State
- NFL draft: 2003: 6th round, 199th overall pick

Career history
- New York Giants (2003–2005); Seattle Seahawks (2006); St. Louis Rams (2006); Oklahoma Thunder (2008); Hamilton Tiger-Cats (2008)

Career NFL statistics
- Receptions: 8
- Receiving yards: 38
- Touchdowns: 0
- Stats at Pro Football Reference

Willie Columbus Ponder (born February 14, 1980) is an American former professional football player who played wide receiver for three seasons for the New York Giants and one season with Seattle Seahawks and St. Louis Rams.

He played college football at Southeast Missouri State University.

== Professional career ==
=== New York Giants ===
Ponder was selected by the New York Giants in the sixth round (199th pick overall) of the 2003 NFL draft. He has contributed as kickoff returner in 2004, when he led the NFL with a kickoff return average of 26.9 yards, the first Giant to lead the NFL in average kickoff return yardage since Clarence Childs in 1964 (David Meggett led the NFC in 1990). For New York, he returned two kickoffs for touchdowns, the first coming against the Pittsburgh Steelers in 2004 and second coming in the 2005 season opener against Arizona. Ponder was benched ten games into the 2005 season despite a kickoff return average of 25.9 yards, in favor of Chad Morton. This led to a decline in the success of Giants special teams. He has lost two fumbles in his career to date, and scored two touchdowns on kick returns as well. He was released on September 2, 2006.

=== Seattle Seahawks ===
He was signed by the Seattle Seahawks on September 5, 2006, and released on October 24, 2006.

=== St. Louis Rams ===
He was on the St. Louis Rams for the 2006 season but was not signed for 2007.

== Semi-pro career ==
Ponder played for the Oklahoma Thunder in the Gridiron Developmental Football League.

== Personal life ==
He is also the cousin of former NFL players Jewerl and Ken Thomas.
