= Erie Express =

American football minor-league professional team

- Founded: 2011
- League: Premier Amateur Football League (2025–present); Tri-Point Football League (2024); Gridiron Developmental Football League (2018–2023)
- Conference: Tier I
- Based in: Erie, Pennsylvania
- Stadium: Dollinger Field (2,000)
- Colors: Navy, red, silver, white
- Owners: Paul Pennington (Co-Owner); Anthony Rodrigues II (Co-Owner); Dane Staaf (Director); Damien Lane (Director)
- Head coach: Charles Porter
- Championships: (GDFL): 2021 (USA Bowl): 2022
- Dancers: Coors Light Girls
- Mascot: Ronnie
- Local media: Erie Times-News
- Website: erieexpressfootball.org

The Erie Express are an amateur American football minor-league team based in Erie, Pennsylvania. Founded in 2011, they are a member of the Premier Amateur Football League. In 2024, the Express played in the Tri-Point Football League (TPFL). From 2018 to 2023, the team played in the Gridiron Developmental Football League (GDFL), winning the championship in 2021. The team plays at Dollinger Field, located on the grounds of Cathedral Preparatory School.

The "Express" name reflects Erie's history as a significant hub for trains and rail transport. In 1910, GE Transportation established a locomotive assembly plant in nearby Lawrence Park. The company also designed the entire town in that area, which remains operational today. Erie also has a storied regional history of trains, especially the Erie Gauge War (1853–54).

== History ==
Before the Erie Express claimed the GDFL national championship in 2021, they had reached the national semifinals twice, in 2018 and 2019.

In 2019, Glen Conner Jr. was a defensive lineman for the Express, wearing number 23. During their 30–6 win over the Westmoreland Wolves on April 22, 2019, Conner was named the team's "Defensive Player of the Week" after recording seven tackles, three tackles for loss (−16 yards), three sacks, and an interception. Glen Conner Jr. is the older brother of National Football League (NFL) running back James Conner, an Erie native who played for McDowell High School before starring at the University of Pittsburgh (2013–2016). James later joined the NFL, playing for the Pittsburgh Steelers (2017–2020) and Arizona Cardinals (2021–present).

Since 2016, the Express has annually hosted the Covato Classic, a game played in memory of former Erie player Tyler Covato, who died in a work-related accident.

=== 2021 National Championship season ===
The Erie Express claimed the Xtreme Conference title by defeating the Columbus Fire from Columbus, Ohio at Erie Veterans Memorial Stadium. This victory earned them their first-ever spot in the GDFL National Championship. On September 5, 2021, they won the championship with a 42–40 victory over the Inglewood Blackhawks from the greater Los Angeles area at Saxon Stadium, on the campus of Mercyhurst University.

The Express advanced to the USA Bowl XV Summer National Championship Game, held at Daytona Stadium in Daytona Beach, Florida, where they faced the Iredell Warriors from Iredell County, North Carolina, part of the Charlotte metropolitan area. The Express entered the game with a perfect 13–0 record, while the Warriors had a 12–1 record in the Carolinas Elite Football Alliance. On January 15, 2022, the Express narrowly defeated the Warriors by a single point, 25–24.

== Logos and uniforms ==
The Erie Express team colors—navy blue, red, silver, and white—reflect the palette of the City of Erie's flag. The primary logo features a metallic football player's face, topped with a train's wedge plow and smokestack, in the team's colors. Above this image is the "Erie Express" wordmark. The secondary logo, displayed on the jersey sleeves, shows a navy blue Pennsylvania keystone, overlaid with a silver E shaped like an industrial wedge plow.

The team's helmets are silver with a red facemask decorated with navy blue and red horizontal stripes. Both sides of the helmet feature a collegiate-style "E" logo in white on red, a design reminiscent of the 2012 Navy Midshipmen football team helmet used in the Army–Navy Game. The team wears navy blue home jerseys with broad silver and red stripes sweeping over the shoulders, and prominently features the secondary logo on the sleeves. The numbers and player names are in red with a white outline. The pants are silver with navy and red side stripes. The away uniforms feature a white jersey with red stripes and numbers outlined in navy blue. The Express wears either red or white pants for this jersey. For the 2021 USA Bowl, the Express wore red jerseys charged with white and navy blue Northwestern stripes.

In 2023, the Erie Express introduced gray jerseys featuring the "NENE" wordmark across the chest as a tribute to Anthony J. "Nene" Rodrigues III, who drowned in Lake Erie on May 21, 2022. Rodrigues was the son of Anthony J. Rodrigues II, co-owner of the Erie Express.

== Home venues ==
- Dollinger Field: 2,000 (2018–present)
- Erie Veterans Memorial Stadium: 10,000. (2022–2024)
- Erie Sports Center: serves as the practice facility. (2021–present)
- Saxon Stadium: 2,300. (2021)
- Gus Anderson Field: former home venue. (2011–2020)
