= Artimus Parker =

American football player (1952–2004)

No. 24
- Position: Safety

Personal information
- Born: January 16, 1952; Winston-Salem, North Carolina, U.S.
- Died: May 4, 2004 (aged 52); Sacramento, California, U.S.
- Listed height: 6 ft 3 in (1.91 m)
- Listed weight: 208 lb (94 kg)

Career information
- High school: Sacramento
- College: USC
- NFL draft: 1974: 12th round, 297th overall pick

Career history
- Philadelphia Eagles (1974–1976); New York Jets (1977)

Awards and highlights
- National champion (1972); Consensus All-American (1973); 2× First-team All-Pac-8 (1972, 1973)

Career NFL statistics
- Interceptions: 5
- INT yards: 60
- Touchdowns: 0
- Stats at Pro Football Reference

Artimus L. Parker (January 16, 1952 – May 31, 2004) was an American professional football player who was a safety for four seasons in the National Football League (NFL). He played for the Philadelphia Eagles from 1974 to 1976 and the New York Jets in 1977. He was selected by the Eagles in the 12th round of the 1974 NFL draft. He played college football for the USC Trojans.
