= John Wood (American football) =

American football player (born 1951)

No. 73
- Position: Defensive tackle

Personal information
- Born: January 20, 1951 (age 75); Lake Charles, Louisiana, U.S.
- Listed height: 6 ft 3 in (1.91 m)
- Listed weight: 249 lb (113 kg)

Career information
- High school: Lake Charles
- College: LSU
- NFL draft: 1973: 3rd round, 70th overall pick

Career history
- New Orleans Saints (1973)

Awards and highlights
- First-team All-SEC (1972)
- Stats at Pro Football Reference

John Curtis Wood (born January 20, 1951) is an American former professional football player who was a defensive tackle in the National Football League (NFL) for the New Orleans Saints for one season in 1973. He appeared in two games with the team that season. He was selected by the Denver Broncos in the third round of the 1973 NFL draft but did not play for the team.

He attended Louisiana State University, where he played college football for the LSU Tigers and was selected to the Associated Press and United Press first-team All-Southeastern Conference teams in 1972 while playing for the LSU Tigers. He was born in Lake Charles, Louisiana, and attended Lake Charles High School.
