= Booker Brown =

American football player (1952–2022)

No. 70, 65
- Position: Offensive tackle

Personal information
- Born: September 25, 1952; Wesson, Mississippi, U.S.
- Died: July 18, 2022 (aged 69); Mojave, California, U.S.
- Listed height: 6 ft 2 in (1.88 m)
- Listed weight: 257 lb (117 kg)

Career information
- High school: Santa Barbara (Santa Barbara, California)
- College: Santa Barbara CC (1970–1971); USC (1972–1973)
- NFL draft: 1974: 6th round, 154th overall pick

Career history
- Southern California Sun (1974); San Diego Chargers (1975–1977); Tampa Bay Buccaneers (1978)

Awards and highlights
- National champion (1972); Consensus All-American (1973); First-team All-Pac-8 (1973)
- Stats at Pro Football Reference

Booker Taylor Brown (September 25, 1952 – July 18, 2022) was an American professional football player who was an offensive tackle for two seasons with the San Diego Chargers of the National Football League (NFL). He played college football at Santa Barbara City College and for the USC Trojans, earning consensus All-American honors in 1973. Brown was also a member of the Southern California Sun of the World Football League (WFL).

== Early life ==
Booker Taylor Brown was born on September 25, 1952, in Wesson, Mississippi. He attended Santa Barbara High School in Santa Barbara, California, where he played football, basketball, and baseball. He was a lineman in football and a first baseman in baseball.

== College career ==
Brown first played college football at Santa Barbara City College from 1970 to 1971. In 2019, Brown was inducted into the Santa Barbara City College Athletics Hall of Fame as a member of their inaugural class.

He was a two-year letterman for the USC Trojans of the University of Southern California from 1972 to 1973. The 1972 Trojans were consensus national champions. Brown was a consensus All-American in 1973.

== Professional career ==
Brown was selected by the Houston Oilers of the National Football League (NFL) in the sixth round, with the 154th overall pick, of the 1974 NFL draft, and by the Southern California Sun of the World Football League (WFL) in the third round, with the 31st overall pick, of the 1974 WFL draft. He decided to sign with the Sun and was a member of the team during the 1974 WFL season.

On May 29, 1975, the Oilers traded the rights to Brown and Benny Johnson to the San Diego Chargers for Carl Mauck. Brown signed with the Chargers on June 20, 1975. He played in 11 games, starting seven, for the Chargers during the 1975 season, recording one fumble recovery. The next year, he was placed on the reserve/non-football illness list on June 20, 1976. He appeared in six games, starting one, in 1977.

On August 4, 1978, Brown was traded to the Tampa Bay Buccaneers for a 1980 fourth round draft pick. He was placed on injured reserve on August 30, 1978, and spent the entire season there. He was released by the Buccaneers on August 21, 1979.

== Personal life ==
Brown was later a pastor and also founded a charitable organization. He died on July 18, 2022, in Mojave, California after an extended illness.
