= 1974 All-Big Ten Conference football team =

College football honors

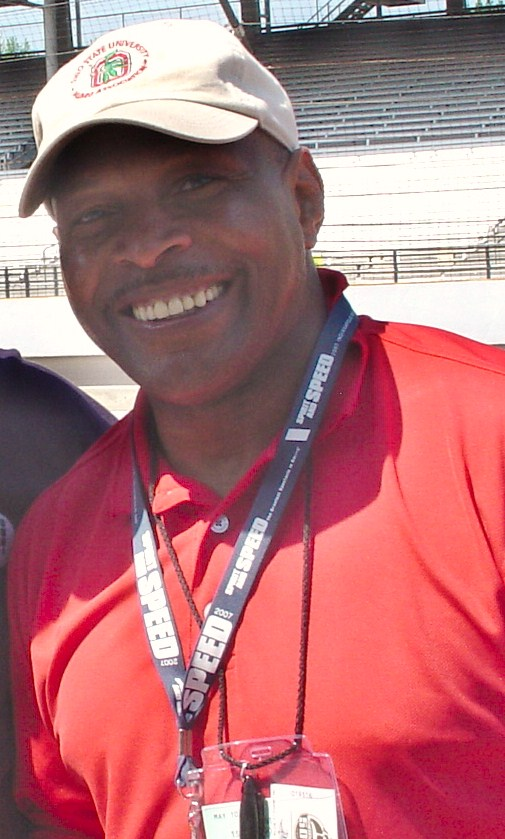
Ohio State running back Archie Griffin

The 1974 All-Big Ten Conference football team consists of American football players chosen by various organizations for All-Big Ten Conference teams for the 1974 Big Ten Conference football season. The teams selected by the Big Ten coaches for the United Press International (UPI) were led by Ohio State with nine first-team selections. Michigan placed five players on the coaches' All-Big Ten first team. Running back Archie Griffin, who won his first Heisman Trophy in 1974, was the only player unanimously selected by the coaches as a first-team All-Big Ten player.

== Offensive selections ==
=== Quarterbacks ===
- Cornelius Greene, Ohio State (AP-1; UPI-1)
- Dennis Franklin, Michigan (AP-2; UPI-2)

=== Running backs ===
- Archie Griffin, Ohio State (AP-1; UPI-1)
- Billy Marek, Wisconsin (AP-1; UPI-1)
- Courtney Snyder, Indiana (AP-1; UPI-2)
- Levi Jackson, Michigan State (UPI-1)
- Gordon Bell, Michigan (AP-2; UPI-2)
- Jim Pooler, Northwestern (AP-2)
- Rick Upchurch, Minnesota (AP-2)
- Gil Chapman, Michigan (UPI-2)

=== Ends/receivers ===
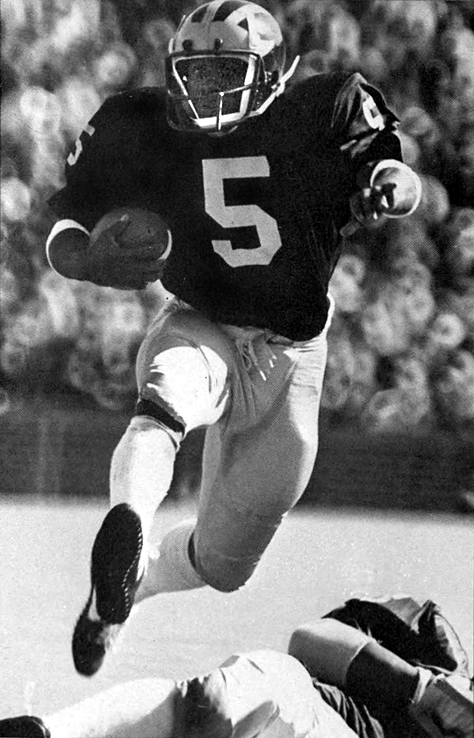
Second-team running back Gordon Bell of Michigan

- Larry Burton, Purdue (AP-1 [end]; UPI-1 [wide receiver])
- Doug France, Ohio State (AP-1 [end]; UPI-2 [tight end])
- Jack Novak, Wisconsin (AP-2 [end]; UPI-1 [tight end])
- Brian Baschnagel, Ohio State (UPI-2 [wide receiver])
- Steve Yelvington, Northwestern (AP-2 [end])

=== Tackles ===
- Dennis Lick, Wisconsin (AP-1; UPI-1)
- Kurt Schumacher, Ohio State (AP-2; UPI-1)
- Paul Hiemenz, Northwestern (AP-1; UPI-2)
- Steve King, Michigan (AP-2)

=== Guards ===
- Ralph Perretta, Purdue (AP-1; UPI-1)
- Dick Mack, Ohio State (UPI-1)
- Terry Stieve, Wisconsin (AP-2; UPI-2)
- Revie Sorey, Illinois (AP-2)
- Joe Devlin, Iowa (UPI-2)

=== Centers ===
- Steve Myers, Ohio State (AP-1 [guard]; UPI-1)
- Dennis Franks, Michigan (AP-1; UPI-2)
- Charlie Ane, Michigan State (AP-2)

== Defensive selections ==
=== Linemen ===
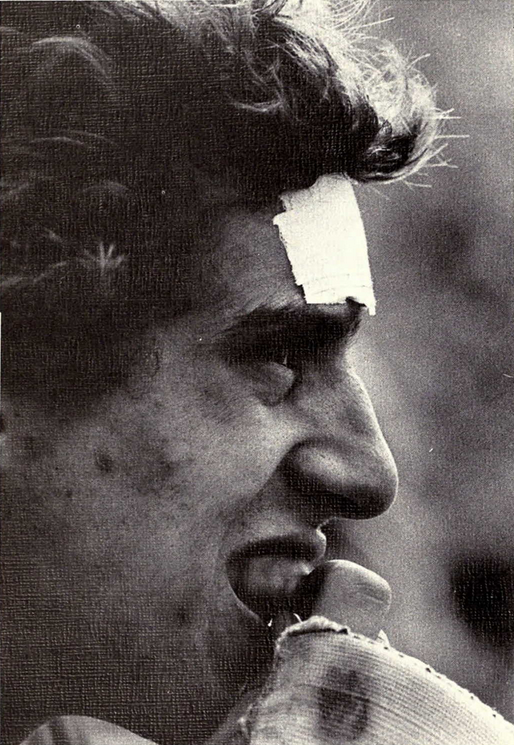
Michigan's Don Dufek

- Pete Cusick, Ohio State (AP-1 [front 5]; UPI-1 [def. tackle])
- Tim Davis, Michigan (AP-1 [front 5]; UPI-1 [middle guard])
- Otto Smith, Michigan State (AP-1 [front 5]; UPI-1 [def. end])
- James Taubert, Michigan State (AP-2 [front 5]; UPI-1 [def. tackle])
- Van DeCree, Ohio State (AP-2 [front 5]; UPI-1 [def. end])
- Dan Jilek, Michigan (UPI-1 [def. end])
- Ken Novak, Purdue (AP-1 [front 5])
- Jeff Perlinger, Michigan (AP-1 [front 5])
- Greg Schaum, Michigan State (AP-2 [front 5]; UPI-2 [def. tackle])
- Keith Simons, Minnesota (AP-2 [front 5]; UPI-2 [def. tackle])
- Jim Cope, Ohio State (UPI-2 [def. end])
- Arnie Jones, Ohio State (UPI-2 [middle guard])
- Lynn Heil, Iowa (AP-2 [front 5])

=== Linebackers ===
- Terrence McClowry, Michigan State (AP-1; UPI-1)
- Steve Strinko, Michigan (AP-1; UPI-1)
- Tom Hicks, Illinois (AP-1; UPI-2)
- Ollie Bakken, Minnesota (UPI-2)
- Bruce Elia, Ohio State (AP-2)
- Rick Jakious, Wisconsin (AP-2)
- Donnie Thomas, Indiana (AP-2)

=== Defensive backs ===
- Dave Brown, Michigan (AP-1; UPI-1)
- Neal Colzie, Ohio State (AP-1; UPI-1)
- Don Dufek, Michigan (AP-2; UPI-1)
- Earl Douthitt, Iowa (AP-1; UPI-2)
- Steve Luke, Ohio State (UPI-1)
- Mike Gow, Illinois (AP-2; UPI-2)
- Fred Cooper, Purdue (UPI-2)
- Tom Graves, Michigan State (AP-2)

== Key ==
Associated Press

UPI = United Press International, selected by the Big Ten Conference coaches

Bold = Consensus first-team selection of both the AP and UPI

== See also ==
- 1974 College Football All-America Team
- 1974 Ohio State Buckeyes football team
