= 1973 All-America college football team =

Official list of the best college football players of 1973

The 1973 All-America college football team is composed of college football players who were selected as All-Americans by various organizations and writers that chose College Football All-America Teams in 1973. The National Collegiate Athletic Association (NCAA) recognizes six selectors as "official" for the 1973 season. They are: (1) the American Football Coaches Association (AFCA) which selected its team for Kodak based on a vote of the nation's coaches; (2) the Associated Press (AP) selected based on the votes of sports writers at AP newspapers; (3) the Football Writers Association of America (FWAA) selected by the nation's football writers; (4) the Newspaper Enterprise Association (NEA) selected based on the votes of sports writers at NEA newspapers; (5) the United Press International (UPI) selected based on the votes of sports writers at UPI newspapers; and (6) the Walter Camp Football Foundation (WC).

Five players are recognized by the NCAA as unanimous All-America selections. They are: (1) running back and 1973 Heisman Trophy winner John Cappelletti of Penn State; (2) offensive tackle John Hicks of Ohio State; (3) defensive end John Dutton of Nebraska; (4) middle guard Lucious Selmon of Oklahoma; and (5) linebacker Randy Gradishar of Ohio State.

== Consensus All-Americans ==
The following chart identifies the NCAA-recognized consensus All-Americans for the year 1973 and displays which first-team designations they received.

| Name | Position | School | Number | Official | Other |
|---|---|---|---|---|---|
| John Cappelletti | Running back | Penn State | 6/3/9 | AFCA, AP, FWAA, NEA, UPI, WC | FN, Time, TSN |
| John Dutton | Defensive end | Nebraska | 6/3/9 | AFCA, AP, FWAA, NEA, UPI, WC | FN, Time, TSN |
| Randy Gradishar | Linebacker | Ohio State | 6/3/9 | AFCA, AP, FWAA, NEA, UPI, WC | FN, Time, TSN |
| John Hicks | Offensive guard | Ohio State | 6/3/9 | AFCA, AP, FWAA, NEA, UPI, WC | FN, Time, TSN |
| Mike Townsend | Defensive back | Notre Dame | 5/3/8 | AP, FWAA, NEA, UPI, WC | FN, Time, TSN |
| Lynn Swann | Wide receiver | USC | 5/3/8 | AFCA, AP, FWAA, NEA, UPI | FN, Time, TSN |
| Lucious Selmon | Middle guard | Oklahoma | 6/1/7 | AFCA, AP, FWAA, NEA, UPI, WC | FN |
| Bill Wyman | Center | Texas | 6/1/7 | AFCA, AP, FWAA, NEA, UPI, WC | FN |
| Dave Gallagher | Defensive end | Michigan | 5/2/7 | AFCA, AP, FWAA, NEA, WC | Time, TSN |
| David Jaynes | Quarterback | Kansas | 4/3/7 | AFCA, AP, UPI, WC | FN, Time, TSN |
| Roosevelt Leaks | Running back | Texas | 5/1/6 | AFCA, AP, FWAA, UPI, WC | FN |
| Booker Brown | Offensive guard | USC | 3/3/6 | AFCA, FWAA, NEA | FN, Time, TSN |
| Dave Casper | Tight end | Notre Dame | 5/0/5 | AFCA, FWAA, NEA, UPI, WC | -- |
| Richard Wood | Linebacker | USC | 4/1/5 | AFCA, AP, UPI, WC | FN |
| Bill Yoest | Offensive tackle | NC State | 4/1/5 | AP, FWAA, UPI, WC | FN |
| Buddy Brown | Offensive tackle | Alabama | 4/0/4 | AFCA, AP, FWAA, UPI | -- |
| Rod Shoate | Linebacker | Oklahoma | 3/1/4 | AFCA, AP, NEA | FN |
| Artimus Parker | Defensive back | USC | 3/1/4 | AP, UPI, WC | Time |
| Dave Brown | Defensive back | Michigan | 3/0/3 | AFCA, FWAA, UPI | -- |
| Randy Rhino | Defensive back | Georgia Tech | 3/0/3 | AFCA, UPI, WC | -- |
| Woody Green | Running back | Arizona State | 2/1/3 | AFCA, WC | TSN |
| Kermit Johnson | Running back | UCLA | 2/1/3 | FWAA, NEA | FN |
| Tony Cristiani | Middle guard | Miami (FL) | 2/0/2 | FWAA, WC | -- |

== Offense ==
=== Receivers ===
- Lynn Swann, USC (AFCA, AP-1, FWAA, NEA-1, UPI-1, FN, Time, TSN)
- Wayne Wheeler, Alabama (WC, FN, TSN)
- Danny Buggs, West Virginia (AFCA, AP-2, UPI-2)
- John Holland, Tennessee State (Time)
- Hank Cook, New Mexico State (AP-3)
- Pat McInally, Harvard (NEA-2)

=== Tight ends ===
- Dave Casper, Notre Dame (AFCA, AP-2, FWAA, NEA-1, UPI-1, WC)
- Andre Tillman, Texas Tech (AP-1)
- J.V. Cain, Colorado (NEA-2, Time, TSN)
- Randy Grossman, Temple (AP-3)
- Paul Seal, Michigan (UPI-2)

=== Tackles ===
- John Hicks, Ohio St. (AFCA, AP-1, FWAA, NEA-1, UPI-1, WC, FN, Time, TSN)
- Booker Brown, USC (AFCA, AP-2, FWAA, NEA-1 [OG], UPI-2 [OG], FN [OG], Time, TSN [OG])
- Daryl White, Nebraska (AFCA, AP-2, NEA-2 [OG], UPI-1, FN, TSN [OG])
- Steve Riley, USC (Time, TSN)
- Al Oliver, UCLA (NEA-1)
- Henry Lawrence, Florida A. & M (NEA-2 [OG], Time)
- Eddie Foster, Oklahoma (WC)
- Charlie Getty, Penn State (AP-3, UPI-2 [OG])
- Jim O'Connor, Arizona (AP-3)

=== Guards ===
- Buddy Brown, Alabama (AFCA, AP-1 [OT], FWAA, UPI-1)
- Bill Yoest, N.C. State (AP-1, FWAA, NEA-2 [OT], UPI-1, WC, FN)
- Tyler Lafauci, LSU (AFCA, AP-1, NEA-1)
- Mark Markovich, Penn State (AP-2, UPI-2)
- Dave Manning, Utah State (AP-2)
- Frank Pomarico, Notre Dame (UPI-2)
- Dave Lapham, Syracuse (AP-3)
- Willie Viney, Pacific (AP-3)

=== Centers ===
- Bill Wyman, Texas (AFCA, AP-1, FWAA, NEA-1, UPI-1, WC, FN)
- Scott Anderson, Missouri (AP-3, NEA-2, UPI-2, Time)
- Steve Corbett, Boston College (TSN)
- Steve Taylor, Auburn (AP-2)

=== Quarterbacks ===
- David Jaynes, Kansas (AFCA, AP-1, NEA-2, UPI-1, WC, FN, Time, TSN)
- Danny White, Arizona State (AP-2, FWAA, NEA-1, UPI-2)
- Jesse Freitas, San Diego State (AP-3)

=== Running backs ===
- John Cappelletti, Penn St. (AFCA, AP-1, FWAA, NEA-1, UPI-1, WC, FN, Time, TSN)
- Roosevelt Leaks, Texas (AFCA, AP-1, FWAA, NEA-2, UPI-1, WC, FN)
- Woody Green, Arizona St. (AFCA, AP-2, UPI-2, WC, TSN)
- Kermit Johnson, UCLA (AP-2, FWAA, NEA-1, UPI-2, FN)
- Tony Dorsett, Pittsburgh (AP-1, NEA-1, UPI-2)
- Bo Matthews, Colorado (Time)
- Archie Griffin, Ohio State (AP-2, NEA-2, UPI-1)
- Sonny Collins, Kentucky (NEA-2)
- Dickey Morton, Arkansas (AP-3)
- Barty Smith, Richmond (AP-3)
- Joe Washington, Oklahoma (AP-3)

== Defense ==
=== Defensive ends ===
- John Dutton, Nebraska (AP-1 [DT], UPI-1 [DT], NEA-1, WC, AFCA, FWAA, TSN [DT], Time, FN [DT])
- Dave Gallagher, Michigan (AP-1 [DT], NEA-1, WC, AFCA, FWAA, TSN [DT], Time)
- Van DeCree, Ohio State (UPI-1, FN)
- Roger Stillwell, Stanford (UPI-1, FN)
- Pat Donovan, Stanford (AP-1)
- Randy White, Maryland (AP-1)
- Fred McNeill, UCLA (TSN)

=== Defensive tackles ===
- Ed Jones, Tennessee State (NEA-1, TSN [DE], Time)
- Randy Crowder, Penn State (UPI-1, FN)
- Bill Kollar, Montana State (NEA-1, Time)
- Paul Vellano, Maryland (AFCA)
- Charlie Hall, Tulane (WC)

=== Middle guards ===
- Lucious Selmon, Oklahoma (AP-1, UPI-1, NEA-1, WC, AFCA, FWAA, FN)
- Tony Cristiani, Miami (FL) (WC, FWAA)

=== Linebackers ===
- Randy Gradishar, Ohio St. (AP-1, UPI-1, NEA-1, WC, AFCA, FWAA, TSN, Time, FN)
- Richard Wood, USC (AP-1, UPI-1, WC, AFCA, FN)
- Rod Shoate, Oklahoma (AP-1, NEA-1, AFCA, FN)
- Ed O'Neil, Penn State (WC, Time, TSN)
- Woodrow Lowe, Alabama (NEA-1, FWAA)
- Warren Capone, LSU (AFCA, FWAA)
- Waymond Bryant, Tennessee State (TSN, Time)
- Cleveland Vann, Oklahoma State (FWAA)

=== Defensive backs ===
- Mike Townsend, Notre Dame (AP-1, UPI-1, NEA-1, WC, FWAA, TSN [S], Time, FN)
- Artimus Parker, USC (AP-1, UPI-1, WC, Time)
- Dave Brown, Michigan (UPI-1, AFCA, FWAA)
- Randy Rhino, Georgia Tech (UPI-1, WC, AFCA)
- Jimmy Allen, UCLA (AP-1, NEA-1)
- Jeris White, Hawaii (TSN [CB], Time)
- Matt Blair, Iowa St. (AFCA)
- John Moseley Missouri (FWAA)
- Bill Simpson, Michigan State (TSN [CB])
- Carl Capria, Purdue (TSN [S])
- Kenith Pope, Oklahoma (Time)
- Harry Harrison, Mississippi (NEA-1)
- Eddie Brown, Tennessee (FN)
- Alvin Brown, Oklahoma State (FN)

== Special teams ==
=== Kickers ===
- Ricky Townsend, Tennessee (FWAA, NEA-2)
- Efren Herrera, UCLA (TSN)
- Mike Lantry, Michigan (FN)

=== Punters ===
- Chuck Ramsey Wake Forest, (FWAA, NEA-1 [K], Time, TSN)

=== Returners ===
- Steve Odom, Utah (FWAA)

== Key ==
- **Bold** – Consensus All-American
- -1 – First-team selection
- -2 – Second-team selection
- -3 – Third-team selection

=== Official selectors ===
- AFCA – American Football Coaches Association chosen for Kodak
- AP – Associated Press
- FWAA – Football Writers Association of America
- NEA – Newspaper Enterprise Association
- UPI – United Press International
- WC – Walter Camp Football Foundation

=== Other selectors ===
- FN – Football News
- PFW – Pro Football Weekly
- Time – Time Magazine
- TSN – The Sporting News

== See also ==
- 1973 All-Big Eight Conference football team
- 1973 All-Big Ten Conference football team
- 1973 All-Pacific-8 Conference football team
- 1973 All-SEC football team
- 1973 All-Southwest Conference football team
