= Erie Veterans Memorial Stadium =

Sports stadium in Pennsylvania, U.S.

Veterans Memorial Stadium (Erie)
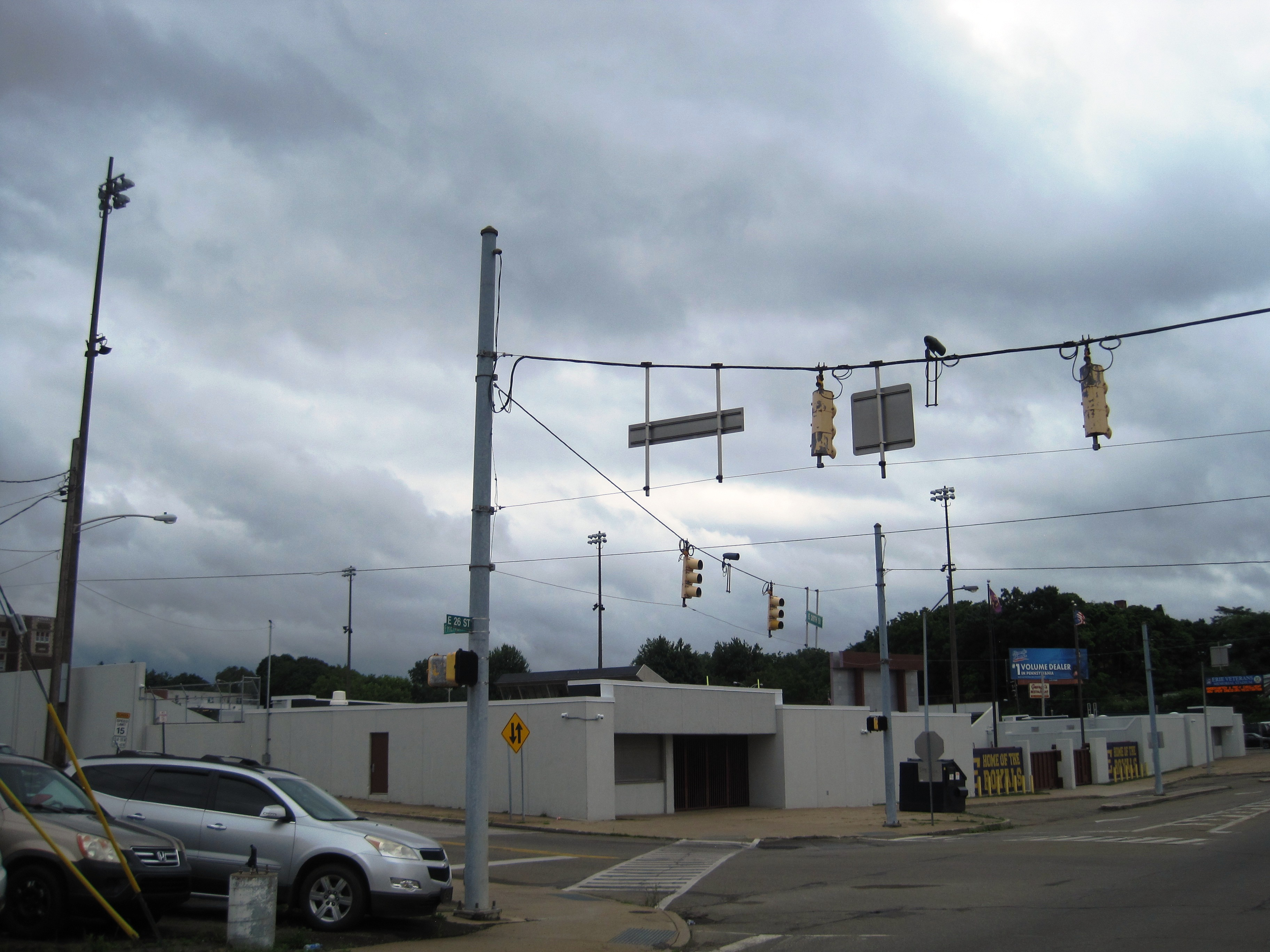
- Interactive map of Veterans Memorial Stadium (Erie)
- Location: East 26th Street; Erie, Pennsylvania 16503, U.S.
- Coordinates: 42°6′41″N 80°4′20″W
- Owner: City of Erie
- Capacity: 10,000

Construction
- Built: 1924

Tenants
- Erie High School (PIAA 6A) (2017-present); Erie Express (GDFL) (2021); Erie Illusion (IWFL) (2003–2016); Erie Vets (AA) (1924–1950); Mercyhurst Lakers (NCAA) (1981–1995)

Erie Veterans Memorial Stadium is a football and soccer stadium located in Erie, Pennsylvania, United States. It was built in 1924 with the 1920 Academy High School building (the current Northwest Pennsylvania Collegiate Academy) overlooking it along its south side, and it was most recently renovated in 2019. The venue, the largest of its kind in the city of Erie with 10,000 seats, hosts high school-level American football games, soccer matches, and marching band invitationals. Additionally, Erie Veterans Memorial Stadium features an artificial turf surface that can be played on during inclement weather.

The stadium has hosted 35 high-school playoff games throughout its history, making it the third-busiest playoff venue in Pennsylvania. Only Hersheypark Stadium in Hershey and Altoona's Mansion Park have hosted more games (98 and 88, respectively).

Erie Veterans Memorial Stadium hosted an NFL Preseason game on August 31, 1940, between the Chicago Bears and the Pittsburgh Steelers.
