= Steve Luke =

American football player (born 1953)

No. 46
- Position: Safety

Personal information
- Born: September 4, 1953 (age 73); Massillon, Ohio, U.S.
- Listed height: 6 ft 2 in (1.88 m)
- Listed weight: 205 lb (93 kg)

Career information
- High school: Massillon Washington
- College: Ohio State
- NFL draft: 1975: 4th round, 88th overall pick

Career history
- Green Bay Packers (1975–1980)

Awards and highlights
- First-team All-Big Ten (1974); Second-team All-Big Ten (1973)

Career NFL statistics
- Interceptions: 10
- INT yards: 149
- Touchdowns: 1
- Stats at Pro Football Reference

Steve Luke (born September 4, 1953) is an American former professional football player who was a safety in the National Football League (NFL). He played college football for the Ohio State Buckeyes and was selected by the Green Bay Packers in the fourth round of the 1975 NFL draft.

== Professional career ==
Luke spent his entire career with the Green Bay Packers and was their starting strong safety from 1976 to 1980.

Luke played in every single Packers game in his 6-year career, from 1975 through 1980. That's 90 games overall.

Before the 1981 season, the Packers traded Luke and a draft pick to the Atlanta Falcons for Dewey McClain and Frank Reed, but Luke did not play for the Falcons.
