= Don Wadewitz =

American sportscaster (born 1974)

Don R. Wadewitz II
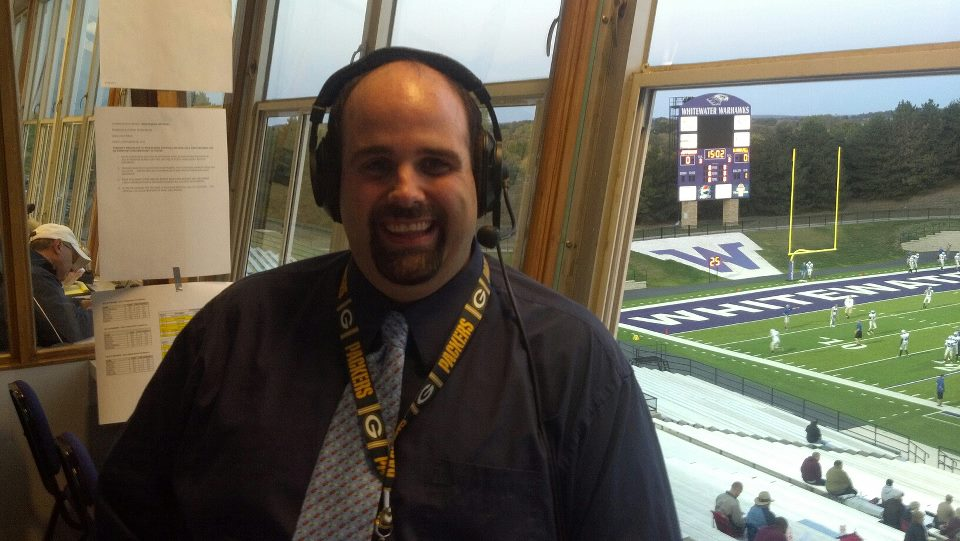
- Sportscaster Don Wadewitz at Perkins Stadium at the University of Wisconsin-Whitewater
- Born: May 20, 1974 (age 52); Racine, Wisconsin
- Occupation: Sportscaster

Donald Rickles Wadewitz II (born May 20, 1974) is an American sportscaster.

== Education ==
Wadewitz was born in Racine, Wisconsin and attended Washington Park High School. He then attended Marquette University in Milwaukee, Wisconsin from 1992 through 2000. He encountered financial issues after his sophomore year and worked part-time on a degree from 1995 until he graduated in 2000 with a degree in Broadcast and Electronic Communication and a minor in criminology.

While at Marquette University, Wadewitz hosted the Wisconsin Jukebox Radio Show on Marquette Radio from 1993 until 2002. The show focused on bands from the state of Wisconsin. Wadewitz was the first deejay at the station to have a website dedicated to his show. He also featured weekly band interviews and live sets in studio. In 2000, Wadewitz received the first ever Don and Kay McNeill Award for Creative Efforts in Student Broadcasting. Danny Pudi, an actor on the television show Community, received the first-ever Chris Farley Scholarship at the same ceremony.

== Career ==
=== Alverno College ===
Wadewitz began broadcasting women's volleyball, basketball, and softball for Alverno College in Milwaukee, Wis., in 2014. He broadcast the entire Northern Athletics Collegiate Conference (NACC) women's softball tournament, hosted by Alverno College, from 2015 through 2018.

=== NRG/Media ===
Wadewitz joined NRG/Media in Fort Atkinson, Wisconsin, in August, 2011. He was the studio host for the University of Wisconsin at Whitewater Warhawks football broadcasts and fills in on broadcasts of men's and women's basketball games for the Warhawks. In March, 2012, he broadcast the Warhawks women's D3 NCAA first round tournament game against Carthage College at DePauw University. Beginning with the 2019 season, he will join Gary Douglas on the broadcast of UW-Whitewater football games.

In addition, Wadewitz broadcasts high school football, basketball, softball and baseball games on AM 940 WFAW and KOOL 106.5 FM.

=== Milwaukee Area Technical College (MATC) ===
Wadewitz became the public address announcer and music coordinator for MATC men's and women's basketball in December 2010. He has also served as the voice of the team's Internet video broadcasts of road basketball games during tournament time.

=== Wisconsin Wolfpack ===
Wadewitz was the "Voice of the Wisconsin Wolfpack," handling play-by-play duties for the professional indoor team in the Continental Indoor Football League (CIFL) in 2009 and 2010. He was named Director of Communications in January 2010. The team announced it wouldn't return for the 2011 season in January 2011.

=== WRJN 1400 AM ===
Wadewitz began handling high school football broadcasts on WRJN 1400 AM in Racine, Wis., in 2006. In 2008, he handled the play-by-play duties for the Wisconsin Interscholastic Athletic Association Division 7 championship game played at Camp Randall Stadium in Madison, Wisconsin, between Hilbert and Burlington Catholic Central. He added high school basketball duties in 2008.

=== Racine Raiders ===
Wadewitz joined the Racine Raiders in January 2003 as the team's Marketing Director. The team quickly realized his talents were more suited for media and public relations and he took over those duties the in 2004. He improved the team's website and set up a communications plan that included an electronic fan newsletter, a database of media contacts, and a better communication system for recruiting players, cheerleaders and volunteers. The Raiders also became one of the first sports teams to utilize social networking websites to promote the team. Minor League Football News named Wadewitz the Public Relations Director of the Year for the Central Region in 2004, 2005 and 2006 for his cutting-edge efforts.

Gary Suhr, the longtime play-by-play person for the Raiders retired in 2002, opening the door for Wadewitz to begin broadcasting Racine Raiders games on AM 1400 WRJN in Racine, Wisconsin. He handled the play-by-play part-time, when the main announcer couldn't attend games.

In 2005, Wadewitz recommended the team begin broadcasting games online, in addition to the broadcasts on WRJN. The Raiders signed a contract with Broadcast Monsters late in the season to test fan interest in Internet broadcasts. Fans responded to the new service well and the Raiders began broadcasting all of their games online in 2006.

Wadewitz convinced the team to go to a three-person radio broadcast in 2006, with him handling the sideline reporting, when he wasn't doing the play-by-play. Fans reacted very positively to the new setup and the Raiders are now the only team in the North American Football League (NAFL) to offer sideline reporting during their radio broadcasts. The three-man broadcast crew was named the Best Sports Broadcast Team in the Racine Journal Times Best of Racine County in 2007. Wadewitz has served as the sideline reporter, color commentator and play-by-play person for Raiders' broadcasts.

In 2008, Wadewitz helped the Racine Raiders become the first minor league football team ever to have a website dedicated solely to recruiting (http://playfortheraiders.com).

Wadewitz received the Public Relations and Media Relations Director of the Year award from the NAFL on December 14, 2009.

=== North American Football League (NAFL) ===
Wadewitz was hired as the Media Relations Director for the North American Football League (NAFL) in February 2008. He served in the position throughout the 2008 season. The NAFL is the largest football league in the country, with over 120 member teams that compete in a national playoff tournament.

=== XROXX LLC ===
While still in college, Wadewitz was approached by his friend Scott Hanson, and asked to be a partner in a business venture. The venture was an online music station and electronic magazine called XROXX. Wadewitz agreed and Hanson, Wadewitz and Paul Gaumond began XROXX LLC. XROXX officially launched on February 14, 2002.

The station mostly played music by independent punk, ska and emo bands. Within the first four months, XROXX had shot into the Shoutcast Top 50 rankings and became the number one punk/ska Internet radio station. New Internet fees for webcasters became too much for the college students to handle and they pulled XROXX off the Internet in August 2002.

After the dust had settled from legal battles over Internet radio, the trio tried to bring XROXX back in 2004. They relaunched on February 14 again and had instant success. The team started out small with 50 connections to the stream and increased their bandwidth as it became regularly maxed out. In just a month, they had tripled their listenership. XROXX LLC released two compilation CDs during the second incarnation. The first, XROXX Rocks! Volume 1, featured all United States bands. The second, XROXX Rocks! Volume 2, featured bands from across the globe. Volume 1 had a print-run of 2,500 copies and Volume 2 had a run of 3,500 copies. Volume 1 is now out of circulation.

The website had volunteer writers from across the globe that would provide content. The website received hundreds of unique visitors each day.

Once again, fees became too much and the trio didn't want to charge fees to listen to XROXX so they shut down shop again in 2005.

=== MLB Fan Strike ===
On May 15, 2002, Wadewitz started a small protest website, MLB Fan Strike, after Bill Michaels, a sports talk show host on AM 620 WTMJ in Milwaukee, suggested someone should start a website protesting a potential strike by Major League Baseball players or a lockout by the owners. The website, mlbfanstrike.com, launched on May 19, 2002.

The website instantly gained national and international media attention. CNN, ESPN, ABC World News Tonight, as well as hundreds of local television and radio stations ran stories on MLB Fan Strike. Articles also ran in several hundred newspapers worldwide.

MLB Fan Strike wasn't the only website calling for fans to boycott baseball. Several others had been started and all of the websites were calling for their own fan strike date. Wadewitz was able to get all of the major websites to agree to several dates for unified, nationwide fan strikes that all of the websites would promote together.

The owners and players were able to avoid a strike or lockout by signing a contract in the eleventh hour on August 31, 2002.

In 2009, the effort was mentioned on the Mental Floss website in an article about nine fan sports protests that stood out. Writer Scott Allen, in placing the MLB Fan Strike effort at number six on his list, said, "The protest was perhaps the most organized in the history of baseball, thanks to the advent of the Internet, but the boycott didn’t exactly go as planned."

=== Wisconsin Area Music Industry (WAMI) ===
Wadewitz became a member of the Wisconsin Area Music Industry (WAMI) in 1994. In 2004, he joined the Board of Directors for the organization and became the Membership Director. His term expired in 2006.

He directed the WAMI 25th Annual Awards Show at the Potawatomi Northern Lights Theater in Milwaukee on April 25, 2005.

== Awards ==
- American Football Association Hall of Fame - Media Category - 2019
- Racine Raiders President's Award - 2016
- Sports Play-by-Play, 3rd Place Small Market Radio - Wisconsin Broadcasters Association - 2016
- Racine Raiders Fred Vance Memorial Volunteer of the Year Award - 2012
- Public Relations and Media Relations Person of the Year - North American Football League (NAFL) - 2009
- Best Sports Broadcast Team - Racine Journal Times, Best of Racine County - 2007
- Minor League Football News (MLFN) National Public Relations Director of the Year - 2007
- Minor League Football News (MLFN) Website of the Year (racineraiders.com) - 2007
- Minor League Football News (MLFN) Public Relations Director of the Year, Central Region - 2004, 2005, 2006
- Racine Raiders Fred Vance Memorial Volunteer of the Year Award - 2006
- Marquette University Don and Kay McNeill Award for Creative Efforts in Student Broadcasting - 2000

== Other Notable Appearances ==
Wadewitz appeared in the Walt Disney Pictures film Mr. 3000, starring Bernie Mac, as a journalist in the scene where Mac's character announces he is coming out of retirement.

Wadewitz has also appeared on the ESPN show Outside the Lines, ABC World News Tonight with Peter Jennings, CNN and dozens of local radio and television stations.
