= Steve Corbett =

American football player (1951–2025)

No. 62
- Position: Offensive guard

Personal information
- Born: August 11, 1951; Dover, New Hampshire, U.S.
- Died: October 30, 2025 (aged 74); Sudbury, Massachusetts, U.S.
- Listed height: 6 ft 4 in (1.93 m)
- Listed weight: 250 lb (113 kg)

Career information
- High school: St. Thomas Aquinas (NH)
- College: Boston College
- NFL draft: 1974: 2nd round, 30th overall pick

Career history
- New England Patriots (1974–1975, 1978–1979)

Career NFL statistics
- Games played: 14
- Stats at Pro Football Reference

Stephen Paul Corbett (August 11, 1951 – October 30, 2025) was an American professional football player who was an offensive guard for one season with the New England Patriots of the National Football League (NFL) in 1975. He was selected in the second round of the 1974 NFL draft with the 30th overall pick. He retired in 1976 because of injuries but attempted a comeback in 1978 and in 1979.
