= Tyler Lafauci =

American football player (born 1952)

Profile
- Position: Offensive guard

Personal information
- Born: February 9, 1952 (age 74); New Orleans, Louisiana, U.S.
- Listed height: 5 ft 10 in (1.78 m)
- Listed weight: 233 lb (106 kg)

Career information
- High school: De La Salle (New Orleans, Louisiana)
- College: LSU (1971–1973)

Awards and highlights
- First-team All-American (1973); First-team All-SEC (1973); Second-team All-SEC (1972)

Tyler Lafauci (born February 9, 1952) is an American former football player for the LSU Tigers of Louisiana State University (LSU). Mainly playing as an offensive guard, Lafauci was a first-team All-American his senior season in 1973. He was also a first-team All-Southeastern Conference selection in 1973 as well as a second-team selection in 1972. Lafauci also occasionally played as a defensive lineman.

Lafauci was born in New Orleans, Louisiana, and attended De La Salle High School there, where as a senior he was a class triple-A all-state selection as both an offensive and defensive guard and was named the state's outstanding lineman. After college, he became a physical therapist in Baton Rouge. In 1983, Lafauci was inducted into the LSU Athletic Hall of Fame.
