= Racine Raiders =

American minor-league football club

- Founded: 1953
- League: Central States Football League (CSL) (1953); Bi-States Football League (BSFL) (1954–1959); Tri-States Football League (TSFL) (1960–1961); Central States Football League (1962–1975); Northern States Football League (NSFL) (1978–1981, 1983–1985); American Football Association (AFA) (1982); Midwest Football League (1986–2006) (MWFL) (1986–1990, 1992–1994); Independent (1991); Mid-Continental Football League (MCFL) (1995–2002); North American Football League (NAFL) (2003–2009); Elite MCFL (2011); MidStates Football League (MSFL) (2010, 2012–2022); Gridiron Developmental Football League (GDFL) (2023–2024); The Players Football Association (PFA) (2025–present)
- Team history: Racine Raiders (1953–1975); North Shore Gladiators (1978); Racine Gladiators (1979–1985); Racine Raiders (1986–present)
- Based in: Racine, Wisconsin
- Stadium: Horlick Field
- Colors: Black, silver, cardinal
- President: Matt Nelson
- Head coach: Wilbert Kennedy
- Championships: 11 (1981, 1983, 1988, 1989, 1992, 1995, 2001, 2012, 2014, 2023, 2024)
- Dancers: Raiders Spirit Squad
- Mascot: R.J. Raider

The Racine Raiders are a semi-professional American football club based in Racine, Wisconsin. The team plays in The Players Football Association (PFA).

Founded in 1953, they are the oldest minor league football team still operating in Wisconsin. They are the second-oldest, non-collegiate sports team in Wisconsin. They own a total of 11 national titles, the most of any semi-pro team in the United States. The Raiders have 667 wins, more wins than any other semi-pro team in the United States.

The Raiders were the first minor league football team to gain 501(c)(3) Not-For-Profit status from the Internal Revenue Service (IRS) in 1990. The organization is composed entirely of volunteers. The helmet design is a silver background with a cowboy bandit in black with an eye patch on the left eye with a half and half bandanna of cardinal and black.

== Staff ==
- President: Matt Nelson
- Vice President of Football Operations/General Manager: Geoffrey Schick
- Head Coach: Wilbert Kennedy

== Franchise history ==
=== Summary ===
William "Wigs" Konicek, a graduate of Horlick High School and local restaurateur, started the Racine Raiders in 1953. The team began in the Central States Football League (CSFL) and won their first league championship as members of the Bi-States Football League (BI-SFL)in 1954.

The team was able to sustain itself until 1975 when it disbanded. Although they did not field a team for the 1976 and 1977 season, they remained organized for those seasons. New owners started the Racine Gladiators in 1978. They paid players and were successful on the field, winning three national championships. The team fell on hard times and disbanded following the 1985 season.

In 1986, Bob Milkie, a retired bearing company executive, Joe Mooney, a police sergeant, Jess Levin, a local banker, and others rebuilt the team, this time as community-owned, non-profit organization.

Perhaps the biggest moment in the team's history, as well as that of minor league football, came in 1989 when the team traveled to Ottawa, Ontario, Canada, to play in a World Championship game. While the team won the game in five degree weather and a blizzard, just playing the game was the important element. The team was now able to apply for, and received, 501(c)3 Not-For-Profit status from the Internal Revenue Service, setting the tone for dozens of minor league football teams since to be able to do the same.

The Raiders have won ten national championships and have had dozens of players with National Football League (NFL) experience. They also have 38 players, coaches, or staff in the American Football Association (AFA) Semi Pro Hall of Fame, more than any other team.

=== American Football Association (AFA) Minor League Football Hall of Fame ===
1982	Harry Gilbert	Coach Category
1987	Bob Milkie	Player Category
1988	Kurt Kampendahl	Player Category
1988	Ed O'Reilly	Coach Category
1989	Greg Johnson	Player Category
1990	Charlie Bliss	Player Category
1994	Norm Killion	Coach Category
1996	Ron Hart	Player Category
1997	Tom Kohr	Coach Category
1999	Arnie Garber	Coach Category
1999	Joe Mooney	Executive Category
2000	John Scardina	Player Category
2001	Phil Micech	Player Category
2002	Tony Lombardo	Player Category
2003	Jordan Kopac	Coach Category
2003	Dennis Galipo	Player Category
2004	Brian Forston	Player Category
2004	Brian Erickson	Player Category
2005	Ron Anton	Player Category
2005	Terry Converse	Coach Category
2005	Gary Kuykendall	Player Category
2005	Mike Willkomm	Player Category
2006	Dan Dragan	Player Category
2006	Gary Suhr	Media Category
2007	Chris Pivovar	Coach Category
2007	Scott Smith	Player Category
2010	Greg Fictum	Player Category
2010	Jerry Kupper	Coach Category
2013	Wilbert Kennedy	Player Category
2013	Brian Jansen	Player Category
2015	Pedro Trevino	Coach Category
2016	Adam Walker	Player Category
2018	Todd Gorsline	Player Category
2018	John Mamerow	Player Category
2019	Mark Trudel	Player Category
2019	Don Wadewitz	Media Category
2022	Greg Erchull	Player Category
2022	Matt Nelson	Player/Coach/Executive Categories

=== Minor League Football News Hall of Fame ===
2007	Brian Forston
2007	Peter Deates
2007	Jordan Kopac
2015	Gary Griffin
2016	Don Wadewitz

=== Retired numbers ===
10	Jim May	Quarterback	1964–1965
11	Charlie Bliss	Quarterback	1980–1989, 1992
23	Tony Lombardo	Running back	1962–1966
51	Bob Milkie	Center	1957–1971
53	L. Fred Vondra	Center	1979–1985
55	Wilbert Kennedy	Defensive tackle	1988–2009
74	Kurt Kampendahl	Defensive tackle	1982–1993
75	Ron Hart	Defensive tackle	1964–1975
82	Ron Anton	Tight end	1964–1973
83	Phil Micech	Defensive end/Defensive tackle/Tight end	1985–1995, 2001

== Players that played professional outdoor football ==
- Todd Cox – Chicago Blitz (1983), St. Louis Cardinals (NFL) (1983), Chicago Bears (1987)
- Danny Crooks – Atlanta Falcons (1971)
- Ron Daugherty – Minnesota Vikings (1987)
- Don Deerwester – Chicago/Bloomfield Cardinals (1947)
- Greg Dubinetz – Cincinnati Bengals (1975), Charlotte Hornets (1975), British Columbia Lions (1977), New York Giants (1977), Toronto Argonauts (1976, 1978), Washington Redskins (1979), Hamilton Tiger-Cats (1980)
- Jim Haluska – Chicago Bears, Cleveland Browns (1956)
- Tony Lombardo – Philadelphia Eagles (1964)
- Brian Lindstrom – Buffalo Bills (1972)
- Phil Micech – Minnesota Vikings (1987)
- Brent Moss – St. Louis Rams (1995)
- Don Perkins – Green Bay Packers (1943–1945), Chicago Bears (1945–1946)
- Tim Rucks – New York Jets (1983)
- Dave Smith (fullback) – Houston Oilers (1960–1964) Sporting News All-AFL in 1960. Member of AFL's first two championship teams in 1960 and 1961.
- Ralph Thomas – Chicago Cardinals (1952), Washington Redskins (1955–1956)
- Matt Turk – Washington Redskins (1995–99), Miami Dolphins (2000–01, 2003–05), New York Jets (2002), St. Louis Rams (2006), Houston Texans (2007–2010; 2011), Jacksonville Jaguars (2011).
- Fred Venturelli – Chicago Bears (1948)
- Adam Walker – Minnesota Vikings (1987)
- Kevin Webster – Minnesota Vikings (1987)
- Brett Wilson – Minnesota Vikings (1987)

== Head coaches ==
1953	Don Perkins	(1–2–2)	.200
1953	Les Kalchik	(1–6–0)	.143
1954–1962	Frank Schinkowitch	(47–47–5)	.475	2 League Titles
1963	Jim Haluska	(2–8–0)	.200
1964–1967, 1982	Harry Gilbert	(44–9–2)	.800	2 League Titles
1968–1969	Jim Thompson	(11–12–0)	.478
1970–1972	Bruno Wojtaszek	(15–24–0)	.385
1973–1974	Warren Greco	(16–9–0)	.640
1975, 1979	Larry Benjamin	(15–12)	.556
1978	Jim Perry	(2–10–0)	.167
1980–81, 1986–90, 1997–2000	Bob Milkie	(137–29–0)	.825	2 National Championships,	1 World Championship,	3 League Titles
1983–1984	Pete Bock	(32–3–0)	.914	1 National Championship,	2 League Titles
1985	Rich McClure	(9–7–0)	.563
1991–1994	Terry Converse	(49–3–0)	.942	1 National Championship,	3 League Titles
1995–1996	Kurt Kampendahl	(29–4–0)	.879	1 National Championship,	1 League Title
2001, 2005–2007, 2011	Jordan Kopac	(60–20–0)	.750	1 National Championship
2002–2004	Gregg Brenner	(36–10–0)	.783
2008–2010	John Mamerow	(24–13–0)	.649
2012–2013	Gino Perfetto	(28–3–0)	.903	1 National Championship,	1 League Title
2014–present	Wilbert Kennedy	(104–25–0)	.806	2 National Championships,	4 League Titles
