= Tony Cristiani =

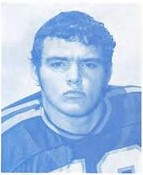
- Cristiani, c. 1973

Profile
- Position: Defensive lineman

Personal information
- Listed height: 5 ft 9 in (1.75 m)
- Listed weight: 215 lb (98 kg)

Career information
- High school: Brandon (FL)
- College: Miami

Career history
- 1974: Chicago Fire*
- 1974: Detroit Wheels*
- 1975: Hamilton Tiger-Cats*
- * Offseason or practice squad member only

Awards and highlights
- Consensus All-American (1973); Third-team All-American (1972)

Tony Cristiani is an American former football defensive lineman. He played college football for the University of Miami. He was a two-time All-American and a consensus All-American in 1973. Cristiani was also a member of the Chicago Fire, Detroit Wheels and Hamilton Tiger-Cats.

== Early life ==
Cristiani comes from a family of circus performers and walked the tightrope at an early age. He attended Brandon High School in Brandon, Florida, and played high school football for the Brandon Eagles, earning all-state honors.

== College career ==
Cristiani received an athletic scholarship to attend the University of Miami, where he played for the Miami Hurricanes football team. He was a consensus first-team All-American in 1973. He had 102 tackles as a senior. Cristiani had 84 tackles and 15 quarterback sacks in 1972. He had 279 total tackles in his career at the University of Miami. Cristiani was inducted into the University of Miami Sports Hall of Fame in 1991.

== Professional career ==
Crisitani spent time with the Chicago Fire and but was released after three days in camp in 1974.

He was a member of the Detroit Wheels of the World Football League in 1974.

Cristiani was signed by the Hamilton Tiger-Cats of the Canadian Football League in May 1975.
