= World Bowl (WFL) =

World Bowl I
Florida Blazers (14–6)	Birmingham Americans (15–5)
21	22
Head coach: Jack Pardee	Head coach: Jack Gotta
	1	2	3	4	Total
FLA	0	0	0	21	21
BIR	0	15	7	0	22
- Date: December 5, 1974
- Stadium: Legion Field; Birmingham, Alabama
- Attendance: 32,376

TV in the United States
- Network: TVS

The World Bowl, also known as World Bowl 1, was the only American football championship game of the short-lived World Football League. The Birmingham Americans defeated the Florida Blazers 22–21 on Thursday, December 5, 1974 at Legion Field in Birmingham, Alabama. George Mira, quarterback for Birmingham was named the game's Most Valuable Player (MVP). It was televised on TVS Television Network.

Original plans for the World Bowl had the 1974 championship scheduled for November 29, the day after Thanksgiving 1974 at the Gator Bowl in Jacksonville, Florida. However, the WFL decided to expand its playoff field from four to six teams, pushing the championship back a week; furthermore, the host Jacksonville Sharks folded during the season, leading to the league moving the game to the home stadium of the higher seeded playoff team (in this case, Birmingham). A cash prize of $10,000 was brought onto Legion Field for the league's season MVP award, which was split between three players. The league presented the players with actual cash ($1 bills stacked on a table) in lieu of the standard practice of a check in order to avoid the scrutiny of whether a WFL check would even clear the bank. However, after the ceremonies, the locker room of the champion Americans was raided and all team assets, including uniforms, were seized to collect on the team's debts. The day before the playoffs began the IRS had put lien on the Birmingham Americans over a $237,000 tax debt. The league negotiated a deal where the IRS allowed Birmingham to play in exchange for a portion of the gate receipts which were used to help pay off the debt. In addition, the Americans and Blazers players had gone unpaid for several weeks and refused to play until they were paid. It took Birmingham's owner Bill Putnam's promise of championship rings if they won and the league dividing the remaining gate receipts 60/40 (based on who won the game) to settle the dispute.

== Scoring summary ==
In the WFL, a touchdown was worth 7 points and teams could run or pass (but not kick) from the five-yard line for an extra point called an "Action Point".

- First quarter
  - No scoring
- Second quarter
  - Birmingham – Profit 1-yard run (pass failed) 0-7
  - Birmingham – Cantrelle 4-yard run (Reed run) 0-15
- Third quarter
  - Birmingham – Brown 26-yard pass from Mira (pass failed) 0-22
- Fourth quarter
  - Florida – Reamon 39-yard pass from Davis (pass failed) 7-22
  - Florida – Latta 40-yard pass from Davis (run failed) 14-22
  - Florida – Foster 76-yard punt return (run failed) 21-22

== Later use of the term ==
There would be no World Bowl 2. The 1975 World Football League season ended with the league's collapse 12 weeks into its second season with the remainder of that season, including the playoffs being cancelled. The Birmingham Vulcans, who held a league best 9-3 record at the time of the shutdown, were proclaimed league champions.

The World Indoor Football League had planned on using the World Bowl name for its championship in 1988, but the league folded without playing any games. The World League of American Football/NFL Europe/NFL Europa used the name in 1991 to 1992, and from 1995 to 2007. When the World Football League was revived as a minor league in 2008, the new league's championship game was also called the World Bowl with the numbering continued from the original. Thus the 2008, 2009, and 2010 championships, all won by the Oklahoma Thunder, were respectively designated World Bowl II, World Bowl III, and World Bowl IV.

== See also ==
- 1974 World Football League season
- 1975 World Football League season
