= Gridiron Developmental Football League =

Minor professional football league in Memphis, Tennessee

- Current season, competition or edition: 2025 GDFL season
- Classification: Low-level minor league
- Sport: American football
- Founded: 2010
- President: Charles Thompson
- Commissioner: Khalid Bey
- No. of teams: 19
- Countries: United States
- Most recent champion: Huntsville Rockets (1st title)
- Most titles: Oklahoma Thunder (5 titles)
- Website: gdfl.org {dead}

The Gridiron Developmental Football League (GDFL) is a low-level American football minor league based in Memphis, Tennessee, using the franchise model. At its peak, the GDFL acted as an umbrella group that encompasses teams from across the contiguous United States.

Teams' typical payroll budget changes between franchises, while salary payment also varies per players and per skillset – as some are getting paid, others are not paid at all and some are getting only "gas money".

In the past, the league had partnering agreements with the Elite Football League of India (EFLI) and the Federación Deportiva Nacional de Fútbol Americano de Chile (FDNFA) for player development.

== History ==
=== Origins ===
The league was first conceived in 2009 and formed in 2010, with Charles Thompson as the founder and first president, and with representatives of several regional semi-pro football teams, that had a plan to form a 32 team pro minor league.

==== Inaugural teams ====
Memphis Blast, Arkansas Pirates, Carolina Warriors, Mississippi Raiders, Huntsville Hurricanes, Derby City Thunder, Hopkinsville Marauders, River City Raptors, Kentucky Wolverines, Ohio Browns, Columbus Gladiators, Tristate Sharks, Goshen Rampage, North Carolina Bengals, Lumberton Razorbacks, Carolina Cougars, Carolina Lions, Carolina Warhawks, Carolina Warriors, Port City Snipers, Beaufort Broncos, Palmetto Havoc, Palmetto State Spartans, CSRA Cobras, Georgia Crush, Rock Hill Scorpions, Lake Norman Fear, Ashville Grizzlies.

=== 2019–2025 ===
In September 2019 the GDFL reached an agreement with Labelle Developmental Football League (formerly Labelle Community Football League) to absorb the league teams under the Gridiron Developmental Football League umbrella, and to launch "GDFL West Coast". On later date, it was announced that the West Coast Football Alliance teams will become GDFL members, and the Colorado Football Association also confirmed that their league teams are joining the GDFL. On October the league and Developmental Football International (DFI) announced joint-venture agreement, that "would strengthen the American developmental football landscape through stability, commercial growth and the professional development of club football in four main regions throughout the United States", with attempt to mirror the United Soccer League.

As with almost all other sports leagues, the GDFL first postponed and then suspended operations during the COVID-19 pandemic.

In 2023 the league announced that the Watertown Red & Black – the oldest active football team in the United States – would be joining the league and the Racine Raiders – the second oldest active semi-pro team in the United States and the semi-pro team with the most all-time franchise wins – would be joining the league.

The GDFL used a playoff format similar to NCAA tournament, as 14 teams - each division champions and at-large teams - making the playoffs, with the two finalists meet in the Gridiron Bowl. The league also has an All-Star game called Hype Bowl, where the best players from the Impact Conference meet their counterparts from Xtreme Conference, and played annually before the championship game.

=== 2026–present ===
After the 2025 season the league decided to move to "semi-pro"/"developmental professional" model, while the season will be split to two - Spring season accumulating in the "Hype Bowl" and "regular" Summer season accumulating in the "Gridiron Bowl". The Memphis Gators beat the Mississippi Road Warriors 32-8 in the first Hype Bowl.

== Teams ==
=== Impact Conference ===
- Impact North Division: Baltimore Lightning, Capital City Seahawks, Mount Vernon Bangers, New York Crusaders, Washington Bulldawgs
- Impact South Division: Buffalo Stampede, Charlotte Colonials, Syracuse Strong, Troy Fighting Irish, Upstate Predators

=== Xtreme Conference ===
- Xtreme North Division: Racine Raiders, St. Paul Pioneers, Englewood Birdgang, River City Sharks
- Xtreme South Division: Huntsville Rockets, Kentucky Spartans, Knoxville Grizzlies, Memphis Panthers, Tri-City Outlaws

=== Notable former teams ===
- Albany Metro Mallers
- Carolina Warriors
- Central Penn Piranha
- Chambersburg Cardinals
- Dallas Diesel
- Erie Express
- Everett Royals
- Inglewood Blackhawks
- Lehigh Valley Storm
- Memphis Blast
- Myrtle Beach Sharks
- Nashville Storm
- Pittsburgh Colts
- Salt Lake City Senate
- SoCal Coyotes
- Tampa Bay Warriors
- Watertown Red & Black

== GDFL National Champions ==
Season	National Title Game	Date	Champions (Record)	Score	Runner-up (Record)	Location
2010	Gridiron Bowl I	Sep 25, 2010	Carolina Warriors (9–0)	15–7	Kentucky Wolverines (10–0)	Memphis, Tennessee
2011	Gridiron Bowl II	Oct 1, 2011	Chambersburg Cardinals (9–0)	19–14	Oklahoma Thunder (9–0)	Tara Stadium (Jonesboro, Georgia)
2012	Gridiron Bowl III	Oct 13, 2012	Central Penn Piranha (9–0)	49–14	South Buffalo Celtics (8–1)	Trojan Stadium (Chambersburg, Pennsylvania)
2013	Gridiron Bowl IV	Sep 7, 2013	Oklahoma Thunder (10–0)	56–8	Lehigh Valley Storm (8–2)	Memphis, Tennessee
2014	Gridiron Bowl V	Sep 27, 2014	Central Penn Piranha (Note: Vacated by the league due to team leaving the GDFL after the season was over.) (8–1)	21–19	Oklahoma City Bounty Hunters (8–2)	Cordova Stadium (Cordova, Tennessee)
2015	Gridiron Bowl VI	Sep 5, 2015	Nashville Storm (8–0)	31–28	Crescent City Kings (7–1)	Victory Field (New Orleans, Louisiana)
2016	Gridiron Bowl VII	Sep 3, 2016	Oklahoma Thunder (8–0)	29–16	Nashville Storm (8–0)	Holland Hall Stadium (Tulsa, Oklahoma)
2017	Gridiron Bowl VIII	Aug 26, 2017	Oklahoma Thunder (8–0)	51–12	Chattanooga Eagles (7–1)	Kirby Stadium (Memphis, Tennessee)
2018	Gridiron Bowl IX	Aug 11, 2018	Oklahoma Thunder (6–2)	38–15	Middle Tennessee Bulldawgs (7–1)	Carver Stadium (Birmingham, Alabama)
2019	Gridiron Bowl X	Aug 17, 2019	Oklahoma Thunder (7–1)	24–12	Middle Tennessee Bulldawgs (8–0)	Fred G. Hughes Stadium (Joplin, Missouri)
2020	Gridiron Bowl XI	Canceled due to COVID-19 pandemic				
2021	Gridiron Bowl XII	Sep 5, 2021	Erie Express (8–0)	42–40	Inglewood Blackhawks (8–0)	Saxon Stadium (Erie, Pennsylvania)
2022	Gridiron Bowl XIII	Sep 3, 2022	Syracuse Strong (10–1)	24–20	Inglewood Blackhawks (10–0)	Clark High School Stadium (Las Vegas, Nevada)
2023	Gridiron Bowl XIV	Sep 2, 2023	Racine Raiders (11–0)	27–18	West Sound Rebels (10–0)	Fairmont Heights High School Stadium (Landover, Maryland)
2024	Gridiron Bowl XV	Aug 31, 2024	Racine Raiders (10–0)	7–6	Upstate Predators (9–1)	Horlick Field (Racine, Wisconsin)
2025	Gridiron Bowl XVI	Sep 7, 2025	Huntsville Rockets	20–8	Tennessee Vikings	Milton Frank Stadium (Huntsville, Alabama)

== GDFL Commissioners ==
- Khalid Bey (2024–present)
- Anthony J. Rodrigues Jr. (2022–2024)
- Bo Townsend (2019–2022)
- George Burch (2017–2019)
- Devin Richardson (2015–2017)
- Steven Roper (2014–2015)
- Charles Thompson (2010–2014)

== Notable players ==
- Delvin Breaux – Former New Orleans Saints player.
- Tyron Carrier – Former Montreal Alouettes player.
- De'Mon Glanton – Former Arena Football League player.
- Keon Lattimore – Former San Francisco 49ers player.
- Kache Palacio – Former Seattle Seahawks player.
- Ryan Travers; Former Buffalo Wolverines Linebacker: GDFL leading tackler 2022; three time NFA Champion
