= International Amateur Football Federation =

- Abbreviation: IAFF
- Formation: 1946; 80 years ago
- Type: International sport federation
- Purpose: Sport governing body
- Headquarters: Honolulu, Hawaii
- Region served: Worldwide
- Official language: English
- President: Leslie Mann

The International Amateur Football Federation (IAFF) was an international governing body of American football. The IAFF was founded by Leslie Mann in 1946 with the purpose of promoting amateur football around the world and eventually getting it placed on the Olympic Games program. It was an early predecessor to the International Federation of American Football.

According to the Honolulu Star-Bulletin, the IAFF had "the blessing of all the collegiate bodies on the mainland".

== History ==
After his MLB playing career, Leslie Mann became a promoter of international amateur baseball, founding the U.S. Amateur Baseball Federation in 1931 and the International Baseball Federation in 1938. He successfully brought baseball to the 1936 Summer Olympics as a demonstration sport and coached the U.S. national team at the inaugural 1938 Amateur World Series. However, Mann's efforts to make it an official Olympic sport were hampered by the outbreak of World War II, which led to the cancellation of the games in 1940 and 1944. In 1945, he moved to Hawaii to accept the role of director of physical education for the territorial USO, and quickly became heavily involved in organizing the local sports scene. By January 1946, Mann was involved in the founding of the International Amateur Football Federation (IAFF) as the international governing body for the sport; he was identified as heading the organization later that year. The purpose of the IAFF was to promote amateur football worldwide and to eventually getting it into the Olympic program. Longtime Hawaiian coach and athletic administrator Tommy Miles was announced as the vice president and executive secretary of the organization.

"Our purpose is to introduce American football into as many countries as possible. At some future date we hope to get this great game on the Olympic Games program as a regular feature." –Leslie Mann in 1948

In early 1946, plans were discussed to send a Hawaii national team to the "first IAAF series" held in London during the 1948 Summer Olympics in an effort to "prove football satisfactorily" to the International Olympic Committee. It was posited in the Honolulu Star-Bulletin that, apart from Hawaii, countries teams "with sufficient experience to demonstrate the game" were the U.S., Cuba, Mexico, Canada, and England, while "China, Japan, the Philippines, Australia, and other European countries played... to some extent before the war."

The IAFF sponsored a December 1946 trip by the Portland Pilots to play against the Leilehua High School alumni and the Honolulu All-Stars.

== 1948 World Amateur Football Championships ==
In October 1946, the IAFF announced the creation of five-team international tournament held in Mexico City between Hawaii, the U.S., Canada, Mexico, and Cuba. Billed as the "World Bowl classic", it was set to start in late December and conclude with the championship game on New Year's Day. Despite plans to select a 23-man squad for Team Hawaii, the tournament did not materialize. The competition was proposed again the following year, with officials from the five nations meeting in Los Angeles on October 29, 1947. Both Mexico City and San Diego submitted bids to host the tournament, which was set for that December with Mann at the helm. It was postponed to the following year.

In July 1948, it was announced that selections from Hawaii, the U.S., Canada, and Mexico would play in the first annual World Amateur Football Championships at Gilmore Stadium in Los Angeles on December 18, 19, and 26. The winners of the four-team playoff, sponsored by the Kiwanis Crippled Children and Charity Foundation, would be awarded the Amos Alonzo Stagg Trophy. Mann received permission from Stagg, then-co-coach at Susquehanna University, to use his name. The tournament complimented an annual all-star charity baseball game put on by the local Kiwanis for the same cause. In order to prevent ties, tournament rules stated that if the score was tied at the end of regulation, the team with the most net yardage would win the game.

Ahead of the opening game of the series, Mann reported that "leading sportsmen" from countries such as China, Cuba, England, Japan, Nicaragua, and Peru had exhibited interest in the tournament. "We hope to bring in teams from some of these countries next year," he said. Tickets to the games were priced between $1.25 and $2.50, with discounts available for high school students and younger children. However, the tournament struggled with low attendance. After the semifinal games, Eric Whitehead of The Vancouver Daily Province remarked: "The Los Angeles crippled children, supposed beneficiaries of this ill-fated series, will apparently get little more than wry smiles from the promoters". Following the Hawaii–Mexico semifinal, which was marred by a brawl, Frank Finch of the Los Angeles Times remarked that the tournament had suffered the "awful fate that almost invariably befalls well-intended attempts to promote international good will in these shredded-nerve times."

=== Teams ===
As an amateur tournament, players had to "come from small colleges, YMCAs, YMHAs, CYOs, civic clubs and amateur leagues". It was later reported that small-college players could come only from colleges "not now members of any intercollegiate leagues". To make the competition more fair, a weight limit of 200 lbs. was placed on American players. Once in Los Angeles, the teams were scheduled for two-a-day practice sessions every day: the U.S. at Pepperdine University, Hawaii at Rancho Cienega Stadium, and both Mexico and Canada at Los Angeles City College.

The U.S. and Hawaii were projected to win their respective semifinal matchups, while the former was heavily favored to win the championship. Due to the abundance of small college players, scouts from various professional teams were on hand for the international series.

==== Canada ====
On September 2, 1948, it was announced that Canada had been admitted as IAFF members, following Hawaii, the U.S., and Mexico. Robert F. Osborne, University of British Columbia (UBC) director of physical education, was appointed the IAFF commissioner for Canada. The UBC Thunderbirds, as the only Canadian college playing under American rules, were immediately assumed to be the Canadian representative for the international series, along with reinforcements from other schools. As expected, most of the players selected were from UBC, with others chosen from schools such as Western Ontario and McGill, as well as two Eastern Canadian amateur leagues. The roster was highlighted by UBC's star left half, Doug Reid, and was strengthened by players such as Pete Thodos of the then-amateur Calgary Stampeders. While unfavorable weather and midterm exams hampered UBC's preparations in Vancouver, head coach Don Wilson said his team would "go down fighting".

The team travelled from Vancouver via bus, arriving in Los Angeles on December 16.

Canada roster
Quarterbacks: 7 Bob Murphy; 8 Hugh McArthur; 19 Bill Surphlis; Halfbacks: 9 Doug Reid; 14 Dave Storey; 15 Bob Minty; 20 Pete Thodos; 21 Walt Chahley; 22 Pete Goodbrod	Fullbacks: 16 Dave McFarlane; 23 John Wells; Ends: 5 Art Miller; 10 Bill Sainas; 12 Dmitri Goulebef; 17 Bob Croll	Guards: 1 Jim Breen; 6 Dick Mitchell; 13 Cece Taylor; Tackles: 3 Lionel Jinks; 4 Alex Lamb; 11 Gil Steer; Centers: 2 Gordon Hogarth; 18 Phil Nixon	Head coach Don Wilson Rookies in italics

==== Hawaii ====
Shortly after the official announcement of the tournament, Mackay Yanagisawa, secretary of the Hawaii Football League, tentatively accepted the invitation pending a decision by team officials. Tommy Miles, the inaugural IAFF commissioner for Hawaii, vacated the position in mid-1948 due to other commitments. He was replaced by Albert Horner, general manager of Hawaiian Canneries, Ltd. in Kapaʻa and former president of the Kauai Athletic Union, who took on the task of prepping for the international series. In early October, it was announced that the champions of the Hawaii Senior Football League (HSFL) would represent Hawaii in the tournament, while a national selection board had final jurisdiction over the squad. The Leilehua alumni captured the HSFL title in November, ostensibly earning the right to represent the islands in Los Angeles. After initially guaranteeing transportation and hotel expenses for the Hawaiian contingent, Mann reportedly offered them a percentage of the gate if they paid for their own transportation. Henry Lee, secretary of the HSFL, assured that Hawaii would not send a team unless both transportation and hotel expenses were provided for.

On December 13, a 22-man roster for the Hawaii All-Stars was announced. 21 of the 22 players chosen were members of the Leilehua Vandals, including player-coaches Spencer Kamakana and Young Suk Ko, with the only exception being Charles Kalani of the Moiliili Cardinals. However, one of the players, William Badayos, was not sufficiently recovered from an injury and was replaced by Farrington High School standout quarterback Ken Kahoonei. A 25-man contingent (22 players and three team officials) flew to California on December 15, (Note: Dave Lewis of the Long Beach Independent reported on December 13, 1948, that only 11 of the Hawaiian All-Stars were from the Leilehua team.) arriving at Los Angeles Municipal Airport the following day on two separate Pan American flights.

Hawaii roster
Backs: Louis Castro; Danny De Rego; Wally DuPonte; Alfred Goya; Ken Kahoonei (Note: Kahoonei replaced an injured William Badayos.); Satoru Kawamata; Thomas Nahulu; Vernon Neves; Rocky Sugino	Ends: Albert Hue; William Pregill; Larry Suganuma; Young Suk Koo	Guards: William Chong; Chester Clarke; Isao Ito; Spencer Kamakana; Tackles: Charles Kalani; Henry Mondo; Len Opuniu; Centers: Masa Gunda; Walter Komatsubara	Rookies in italics

==== Mexico ====
The Mexican college football season was concluded by November 20, after which a Mexican all-star squad from six colleges played against the U.S. Pacific Area Fleet champions on December 11 in the second annual Silver Bowl in Mexico City as a warm-up to the tournament. Many of the same players were included on the 28-man roster for the international series, which was released on December 14. The squad was composed of players from five schools (excluding UNAM) picked by Burros Blancos head coach Salvador Mendiola, who was assisted on the staff by Mexico City College head coach and Los Angeles native Dave LaTourrette. The next day, the Mexican contingent flew from Mexico City to Los Angeles, staying at nearby Chapman College.

Dave Lewis of the Long Beach Independent projected the Mexican selection would be "better... than any yet formed in Mexico" due to the presence of "many American trained Mexican youths" on the squad – most of whom were attending Mexico City College under the G.I. Bill – while highlighting their "big gun" of a fullback.

Mexico roster
Quarterbacks: 5 Alfredo Mota; 16 Gene Lepper; Halfbacks: 13 Sergio Cordero; 21 Manuel Vallarí; 27 Alfonso Portilla; 31 Earl Brizendine; 45 Alberto Córdoba; 46 Pablo Salazar; 51 Héctor Córdoba	Fullbacks: 19 Warren Haslam; 50 Charles Leckta; Ends: 24 Joaquin Zapata; 35 Rime Correo; 40 José Loza; 41 Moises Hernández; 42 Bob Wheeler; 44 Uriel González	Guards: 18 Ronnie Leckta; 25 Juan Rangal; 29 Bob Eigelberger; 47 Guillermo Ziaurriz; 52 Jesús González; Tackles: 28 Morris Williams; 33 Mario Martínez; 36 Flavio Vásquez; 37 Roland Howe; 48 Raúl Rabago; Centers: 22 Salvador Saldaña; 53 Duane Coston	Head coach Salvador Mendiola Assistants Dave LaTourrette Rookies in italics

==== United States ====
In October 1948, nomination blanks were mailed to coaches from qualifying small colleges around the U.S. to submit outstanding players for selection to the U.S. team. After players were submitted by small colleges, civic leagues, and other eligible organizations, the final roster was chosen by a national selection board. Pepperdine head coach Warren Gaer was appointed the team's head coach in late October, and Springfield head coach Ossie Solem was named the associate head coach soon afterwards.

On December 3, a preliminary 31-man roster for the American All-Stars was released by Mann, which was followed by the release of a final 25-man roster. Notably, Gaer recruited local phenom and Compton Junior College standout Hugh McElhenny, who was not on the preliminary roster and joined the team on December 14. His teammate, Bill Fell, was sought by the U.S. coaches too, but was reportedly "looking for a job during the holidays". Another local player, Whittier end Earl Ryerson, was added to the roster, as well as William Hicks.

Players from the American All-Stars arrived in Los Angeles on December 13 and 14.

United States roster
Quarterbacks: 9 Hank Witt (Newberry); 11 Ed Hyduke (Pepperdine); Halfbacks: 3 Ed Stoeckel (Springfield); 4 Charles Norris (Alameda NAS); 6 Terry Bell (Pepperdine); 7 J. Adair Robinson (Wesleyan)	Fullbacks: 1 Ronald Jackson (Western Illinois State); 2 Hugh McElhenny (Compton JC); 5 Harry Beck (Eagle Rock AC); 10 Mugsy Walsh (Eagle Rock AC); Ends: 80 Bill Beal (Eagle Rock AC); 81 Norm Stillwell (Pepperdine); 82 Earl Ryerson (Whittier); 83 Don Hibbard (Caltech)	Guards: 60 Bill Hammer (Springfield); 61 Keith Skogman (Gustavus Adolphus); 62 Harry Auble (Springfield); 63 Emerson Grossman (Western Michigan); Tackles: 70 Dawson Scarborough (Newberry); 71 Manuel Bass (Caltech); 72 William Hicks; 75 Vincent Tagupa (Pepperdine); 78 Richard Rockenbach (Illinois State Normal); Centers: 50 Paul Wright (Eastern Kentucky); 51 Harold Swanson (Gustavus Adolphus)	Head coach Warren Gaer Assistants Ossie Solem Rookies in italics

Players on the preliminary squad not included on the final roster include:

- Bob Boyd – end, Loyola (CA)
- Elmer Franklin – halfback, Montebello AC
- Olin Ison – end, Montebello AC
- Wendell Patterson – left tackle/guard, Arizona State
- Earl Plyley – tackle, Eagle Rock AC
- Bob Robinson – tackle, Venice AC
- Tom Tolman – back, Venice AC
- Wilford White – halfback, Arizona State
- Bob Winship – halfback, Loyola (CA)

Illinois Wesleyan captain Curtis Brown was invited by Mann to take part in the tournament, but he turned down the opportunity to concentrate on his studies.

=== Tournament ===
Semi-Finals
A1	United States	43
B1	Canada	0
A2	Hawaii	37
A3	Mexico	0

Final
United States
Hawaii
3rd Place Match
Canada	20
Mexico	0

==== Semifinals ====
Game 1

Quarter	1	2	3	4	Total
United States	7	13	20	3	43
(Canada) United States	0	0	0	0	0

at Gilmore Stadium, Los Angeles, California, U.S.

- Date: December 18, 1948
- Game time: 2:00 p.m. PT
- Game attendance: 1,152 (Note: This is the attendance as reported by the Los Angeles Times. The figure is alternatively reported as: "less than 500" by the Associated Press and "about 600" by The Pasadena Independent)
- Referee: Officials: Ref: Joe Fleming (UCLA) Ump: Art Schuettner (Illinois Teachers) Line: Ken Griffin (UCLA) FJ: Frank Flanegin (Occidental)

Statistics	USA	CAN
First downs	11	10
Yards	400	137
Rushing yards	274	69
Passing yards	126	68
Passing: comp–att–int	8–14–1	7–27–3

In the first semifinal, the United States defeated Canada 43–0. Hugh McElhenny opened up the scoring with a 25-yard touchdown run in the first quarter. He scored again early in the second quarter, capping off a 90-yard drive with a three-yard touchdown run. The U.S. extended their lead with a 22-yard touchdown pass (Note: Alternatively reported as 23 yards) from Ed Hyduke to his Pepperdine teammate, Norm Stillwell, and the score was 20–0 at halftime. Frank Finch of the Los Angeles Times reported that "the tiring Canadians folded as neatly as a road map" after halftime, giving up 20 points in the third quarter. Terry Bell caught a 24-yard touchdown pass from Hank Witt and added another score on the ground, this one from 44 yards. (Note: Alternatively reported as 43 yards.) McElhenny "smashed... around right end" to score a 25-yard rushing touchdown to make the score 40–0.

In the fourth quarter, the U.S. began kicking on first down and attempting field goals from unorthodox angles in an apparent attempt to avoid running up the score. However, according to Finch, "It would have been far less humiliating for the Canadians if the United States team had kept trying, irregardless of the final score." McElhenny was "booed lustily" when he was sent on the field to kick a short field goal near the end of the game, which he successfully converted to bring the final score to 43–0. Canada threatened the score in the game's final moments, but halfback Dave Storey fumbled the ball near the goal line to thwart their drive. McElhenny led the way for the U.S. selection, finishing with 122 rushing yards and three touchdowns on 14 carries while making an interception on defense. According to the Associated Press, "The plucky Canadians boasted no offense to cope with the punch displayed" by McElhenny, Bell, and Witt. The Canadian team gained just 137 yards on offense compared to 400 yards by the Americans.

Around $750 was stolen from the Canadian players' wallets in the team's locker room during the game. Los Angeles City Council member George P. Cronk led a campaign to restitute their losses, raising part of the total at a Wiltshire Kiwanis club luncheon, while more money was wired to the team by UBC officials.

Game 2

Quarter	1	2	3	4	Total
Hawaii	0	19	18	0	37
Mexico	0	0	0	0	0

at Gilmore Stadium, Los Angeles, California, U.S.

- Date: December 18, 1948
- Game time: 2:00 p.m. PT
- Game attendance: 1,500–2,000 (Note: The Los Angeles Times reported an attendance of 1,500, while the Associated Press and the United Press reported an attendance of 2,000.)
- Referee: Officials: Ref: Wendall Smith (Occidental) Ump: Art Williams (UCLA) Line: Gail Wyatt (UCLA) FJ: Ed Carmichael (UCLA)

Statistics	HAW	MEX
First downs	13	10
Yards	381	164
Rushing yards	140	95
Passing yards	241	69
Passing: comp–att–int	11–25–2	10–25–3

In the second semifinal, Hawaii defeated Mexico 37–0. Frank Finch of the Los Angeles Times called it "a sloppy game, with sloppier officiating", criticizing the referees' inconsistencies and various oversights, such as permitting Mexico to run five plays in one series of downs instead of the maximum four. After a scoreless first quarter, Rocky Sugino of Hawaii recovered a fumble at the Mexico 10-yard line, setting up a seven-yard touchdown run by halfback Wally DuPont for a 6–0 lead. Following another fumble by Mexico on their own 33-yard line, Hawaiian end Larry Suganuma caught a pass from quarterback Louis Castro and then lateralled to DuPont, who in turn ran for a touchdown. (Note: This is according to the Associated Press. It is reported in other sources that the lateral play set up a shorter touchdown run by DuPont.) Castro converted the only successful extra point of the game to extend the lead to 13–0. Late in the second quarter, Hawaiian back Danny DeRego intercepted a pass by back Sergio Cordero and returned it 55 yards (Note: Alternatively reported as 54 yards.) for a touchdown to make the halftime score 19–0. DuPont opened the second half with a 37-yard kickoff return, setting Hawaii up just inside their opponent's territory. On the ensuing play, Castro threw a 49-yard touchdown pass to Suganuma to bring the score to 25–0. Hawaii scored twice more in the third quarter: a two-yard touchdown run by back Vernon Neves which completed a 67-yard drive and a 49-yard touchdown pass from back Ken Kahoonei to DuPont. Both teams failed to score in the fourth quarter, and 37–0 was the final score. Mexico converted ten first downs in the game but "never was able to manufacture a consistent offensive"; they had a late drive thwarted by multiple drops of passes thrown by fullback Warren Haslam.

The game, which featured "intermittent slugging throughout" and had already seen two Hawaiians and one Mexican ejected, devolved into a chaotic brawl with about 30 seconds left on the clock. (Note: Other sources report that there two minutes on the clock.) Players and fans rushed onto the field in what Finch described as a riot, though it was quickly broken up by police and other officials after "a minute or so" with no serious injuries reported. After the field was cleared, the remaining 30 seconds of gametime were played "without further international incidents" before handshakes were exchanged between the two sides.

"Tempers already were hotter than a bowl of chili when an unidentified Hawaiian player started swinging. In a trice knucles were flying, cleated hoofs were kicking and bench warmers and spectators were charging up like a band of rurales pursuing a bandit gang... There was a momentary lull as the Hawaiians and Mexicans massed their forces about 15 yards apart, glaring at each other across No Man's Land. Then a son of Montezuma got his second wind and charged into a son of King Kamehameha and it was "Waltz Me Around Again, Willie." A few more pearly teeth were busted loose from their moorings before two of Sheriff Biscailuz's intrepid gendarmes waded into the melee and spoiled the party." –Frank Finch of the Los Angeles Times describing the brawl towards the end of the Hawaii–Mexico game
