= Charlie Tate =

American football player and coach (1919–1996)

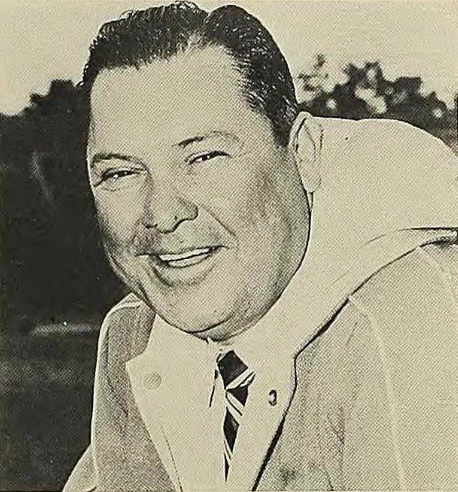
- Tate from The 1963 Blue Print

Biographical details
- Born: February 20, 1919; Tracy City, Tennessee, U.S.
- Died: June 10, 1996 (aged 77); Morganton, Georgia, U.S.

Playing career
- 1939–1941: Florida
- Position: Fullback

Coaching career (HC unless noted)
- 1951–1955: Miami HS (FL)
- 1956: Florida (freshmen)
- 1957–1963: Georgia Tech (backfield)
- 1964–1970: Miami (FL)
- 1971: New Orleans Saints (offensive backs)
- 1974: Jacksonville Sharks
- 1975: Jacksonville Express

Administrative career (AD unless noted)
- 1968–1971: Miami

Head coaching record
- Overall: 34–27–3 (college); 8–11 (WFL)
- Bowls: 1–1

Accomplishments and honors

Awards
- Florida Sports Hall of Fame

Baseball career
- Catcher
Medals
Representing United States
Baseball World Cup
| Silver medal – second place | 1938 Great Britain | Team |

Charles William Tate (February 20, 1919 – June 10, 1996) was an American football player and coach. Tate served as the head coach of the University of Miami for six seasons during the 1960s and two games during the 1970 season.

== Early life ==
Charlie Tate was born in the small town of Tracy City, Tennessee, and later attended Julia E. Landon High School in Jacksonville, Florida.

After graduating high school, he was selected to the United States national baseball team organized by Leslie Mann that played in the inaugural 1938 Amateur World Series, which became retroactively known as the first international baseball world championship.

== Career ==
Tate attended the University of Florida in Gainesville, Florida, where he was a starting fullback for coach Josh Cody and coach Tom Lieb's Florida Gators football teams from 1939 to 1941. Memorably, he scored the Gators' only touchdown in their 7–7 tie of the Auburn Tigers in the first varsity game ever played in the Tigers' new Auburn Stadium. Tate graduated from the University of Florida with a bachelor's degree in education in 1942.

Tate was the head football coach of the Miami Hurricanes football team of the University of Miami in Coral Gables, Florida, from 1964 to 1970. In six seasons and part of a seventh, he compiled an overall win–loss record of 34–27–3. His best season with the Hurricanes came in 1966, when his team went 8–2–1 and won the Liberty Bowl against Virginia Tech. Tate's departure from Miami was surrounded by controversy and attracted national media attention when he abruptly resigned as the Hurricanes' athletic director and head football coach after the second game of the 1970 football season.

Chuck Foreman was Tate's most famous recruit in the late 1960s. When interviewed at the ESPN Club in Orlando, Florida, Foreman, who went on to have a great career in the National Football League for the Minnesota Vikings, said of Tate, "He had faith in me, as a black athlete in the South during that tumultuous time, and I will never forget him. He was a great, generous man."

Tate also served as the head coach of two professional football teams, the Jacksonville Sharks and Jacksonville Express in the short lived World Football League in the mid-1970s. He was inducted into the Florida Sports Hall of Fame in 1988.

== Death ==
Tate died in 1996 from complications related to pneumonia and Alzheimer's disease.

== Head coaching record ==
=== College ===
| Year | Team | Overall | Conference | Standing | Bowl/playoffs | Coaches^{#} | AP^{°} |
|---|---|---|---|---|---|---|---|
Miami Hurricanes (NCAA University Division independent) (1964–1970)
| 1964 | Miami | 4–5–1 | | | | | |
| 1965 | Miami | 5–4–1 | | | | | |
| 1966 | Miami | 8–2–1 | | | W Liberty | 10 | 9 |
| 1967 | Miami | 7–4 | | | L Bluebonnet | 16 | |
| 1968 | Miami | 5–5 | | | | | |
| 1969 | Miami | 4–6 | | | | | |
| 1970 | Miami | 1–1 | | | | | |
| Miami: | | 34–27–3 | | | | | |
| Total: | | 34–27–3 | | | | | |
^{#}Rankings from final Coaches Poll.; ^{°}Rankings from final AP Poll.

== See also ==
- Florida Gators
- Miami Hurricanes
- List of University of Florida alumni
