= Whitey Platt =

American baseball player (1920–1970)

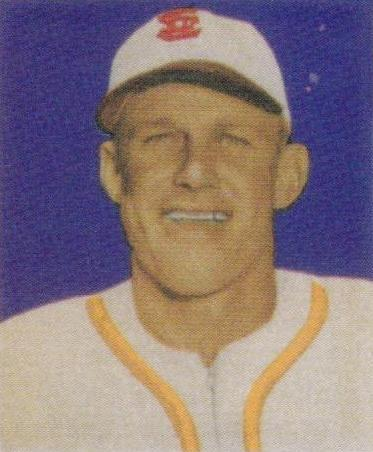
- Outfielder
- Born: August 21, 1920; West Palm Beach, Florida, U.S.
- Died: July 27, 1970 (aged 49); West Palm Beach, Florida, U.S.
- Batted: Right Threw: Right

MLB debut
- September 16, 1942, for the Chicago Cubs

Last MLB appearance
- October 2, 1949, for the St. Louis Browns

MLB statistics
- Batting average: .255
- Home runs: 13
- Runs batted in: 147
- Stats at Baseball Reference

Teams
- Chicago Cubs (1942–1943); Chicago White Sox (1946); St. Louis Browns (1948–1949)
Medals
Men's baseball
Representing United States
Baseball World Cup
Silver medal – second place	1938 Great Britain	Team

Mizell George "Whitey" Platt (August 21, 1920 – July 27, 1970) was an American right-handed Major League Baseball (MLB) outfielder who played from 1942 to 1943 for the Chicago Cubs, in 1946 for the Chicago White Sox and from 1948 to 1949 for the St. Louis Browns. He also played on the first official United States national baseball team at the 1938 Amateur World Series.

== Career ==
Prior to playing professionally, Platt attended Palm Beach High School in West Palm Beach, Florida. In 1938, he joined the United States team under international baseball proponent Leslie Mann to compete in the inaugural Amateur World Series in England.

He made his major league debut with the Chicago Cubs on September 16, 1942. He played in four games that season, collecting one hit in 16 at-bats for a .063 batting average. In 1943, he hit .171 in 41 at-bats, with three of his seven hits being doubles.

He missed the 1944 and 1945 seasons while serving with the United States Navy in the Pacific Theatre of World War II.

Selected off waivers by the Chicago White Sox from the Cubs on April 20, 1946, Platt played in 84 games that year, hitting .251 with three home runs and 32 RBI in 247 at-bats. He next played in the major leagues in 1948, hitting .271 with seven home runs and 81 RBI in 123 games with the St. Louis Browns. In 1949, his final season, he hit .258 with three home runs and 29 RBI in 102 games. He played his final game on October 2, 1949.

He also played 11 seasons in the minor leagues, hitting .299 with 1,378 hits, 274 doubles, 44 triples and 95 home runs. Perhaps his best season was in 1942, when he hit .349 with 40 doubles, six triples and nine home runs.

When the Browns faced black pitcher Satchel Paige of the Cleveland Indians in 1948, Platt told manager Zack Taylor that he would not play against him. Taylor insisted that he play anyway. When it was Platt's turn to hit, he threw his bat at the pitcher, though Paige avoided getting whacked by it.

In 1953, he managed the West Palm Beach Indians for the beginning of the season, being replaced eventually by Bubba Harris.

He was interred at Hillcrest Memorial Park in West Palm Beach, Florida.
