= Mike Schemer =

American baseball player (1917–1983)

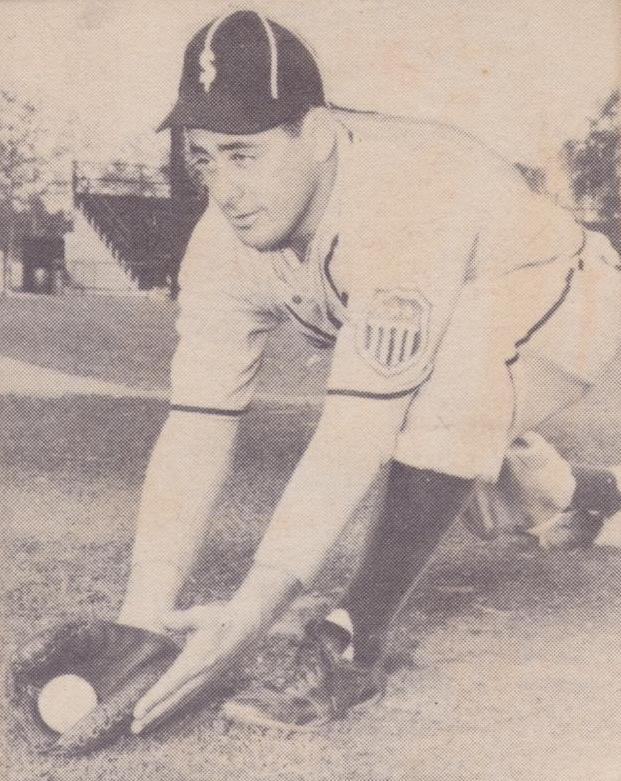
- First baseman
- Born: November 20, 1917; Baltimore, Maryland, US
- Died: April 22, 1983 (aged 65); Miami, Florida, US
- Batted: Left Threw: Left

MLB debut
- August 8, 1945, for the New York Giants

Last MLB appearance
- April 24, 1946, for the New York Giants

MLB statistics
- Batting average: .330
- Home runs: 1
- Runs batted in: 10
- Stats at Baseball Reference

Teams
- New York Giants (1945–1946)
Medals
Men's baseball
Representing United States
Baseball World Cup
Silver medal – second place	1938 Great Britain	National team

Michael Schemer (November 20, 1917 – April 22, 1983), nicknamed "Lefty", was an American professional baseball player whose eight-year (1940–1942; 1944–1948) career included 32 games played in Major League Baseball for the 1945–1946 New York Giants. A first baseman, he stood 6 ft 0 in (1.83 m) and weighed 180 pounds (82 kg).

== Early life ==
A native of Baltimore, Maryland, he was Jewish and the son of an Orthodox rabbi. He attended Miami High School and the University of Miami.

Schemer served in the United States Army during the World War II era.

== Baseball career ==
Prior to his professional career, Mike played as an amateur on the United States team assembled by international baseball proponent Leslie Mann in the inaugural Amateur World Series held in England in 1938.

All but one of his Major League appearances occurred during the 1945 season. Called up from the Jersey City Giants of the International League, Schemer made his MLB debut for the New York Giants on August 8, 1945, against the St. Louis Cardinals at the Polo Grounds. He notched two singles in four at bats against Cardinals' left-hander George Dockins. He hit well for the Giants in his rookie season. In 31 games he had a batting average of .333 (36-for-108) with one home run, 10 runs batted in, 10 runs scored, and a slugging percentage of .407. Defensively, he made two errors in 27 appearances at first base and had a fielding percentage of .993. He hit his only MLB home run on August 20, a three-run blast against Hank Wyse, the 20-game-winner from the Chicago Cubs.

However, with the return of Giants' slugger Johnny Mize from military service in 1946, Schemer would get into only one more game for New York. On April 24, 1946 he went 0-for-1 as a pinch-hitter, bringing his lifetime average down to .330.

== Personal life ==
Schemer married Illinois native Gloria Lowe and divorced in the mid 60’s. They had three children: Nancy, Michael, and Sophie Schemer.

Schemer died at the age of 65 in Miami, Florida.
