= Norman Livermore =

American environmentalist and baseball player

Norman B. Livermore Jr.
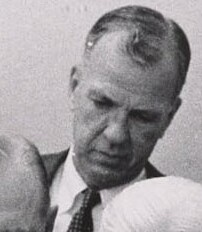
- Norman Livermore in 1968
- Born: Norman Banks Livermore, Jr; March 27, 1911; San Francisco, California, US
- Died: December 5, 2006 (aged 95); Novato, California, US
- Occupation: Environmentalist
- Political party: Republican

Norman Banks "Ike" Livermore Jr. (March 27, 1911 – December 5, 2006) was an American environmentalist, lumber industry executive, and state official. He was the only member of California governor Ronald Reagan's cabinet to serve during the full eight years of his administration. He played baseball at the 1936 Summer Olympics in Berlin.

== Early life and education ==
Livermore was descended from a pioneer California family with roots in Maine. An ancestor, Elijah Livermore, built a grist mill and a saw mill on the Androscoggin River in 1791. The town of Livermore Falls, Maine, is named after that ancestor.

His great-grandfather, Horatio Gates Livermore, came to California from Maine during the Gold Rush in 1850, and later became a State Senator from Eldorado County. His great-grandfather and his grandfather, Horatio Putnam Livermore, who came to California in 1856, used their Maine mill experience to become involved in the earliest days of hydroelectric power, helping to build the original Folsom Dam. His father, Norman Banks Livermore, was a founding board member of Pacific Gas and Electric. His mother, Caroline Sealy Livermore, was a conservationist in the San Francisco Bay Area, working on protection of the Marin Headlands and Richardson Bay; Mount Livermore on Angel Island is named after her. He had four brothers, geologist John Livermore (1918-2013), Putnam Livermore, Robert Livermore, and George Livermore.

Livermore was born in San Francisco in 1911, and grew up on Russian Hill. His summers in childhood were spent at his family's Montesol Ranch on the slopes of Mount Saint Helena that extended into Napa County, Sonoma County, and Lake County. He attended The Thacher School, a private boarding school in Ojai, California, where the "challenges of academics are combined with those of mountains and horses." At age 15, he rode his horse from Ojai to Big Sur, a distance of nearly 250 miles (400 km). He also climbed the Grand Teton in tennis shoes as a youth.

Livermore attended Stanford University, receiving a bachelor's degree in Social Science/Social Thought in 1933. He went on to study briefly at the Harvard Business School after graduation. Missing the mountains of the west, he returned to California and earned an MBA from the Stanford Business School in 1936. His thesis was called The Economic Significance of California's Wilderness Areas.

== Olympic athlete ==
Livermore had been the captain of the Stanford University baseball team. Former professional baseball player Les Mann was an advocate for baseball as an Olympic sport. As a result of Mann's efforts, baseball was selected as a demonstration sport in the 1936 Summer Olympics played in Berlin. Originally, the United States team was scheduled to play a Japanese team, but the Japanese withdrew. The American team was separated into two squads who competed against each other in a single game. Livermore was the catcher for the "World Champions" lineup which beat the "U. S. Olympics" lineup to win the demonstration game 6-5 before a crowd of 90,000 people on August 12, 1936.

== Pack station operator ==
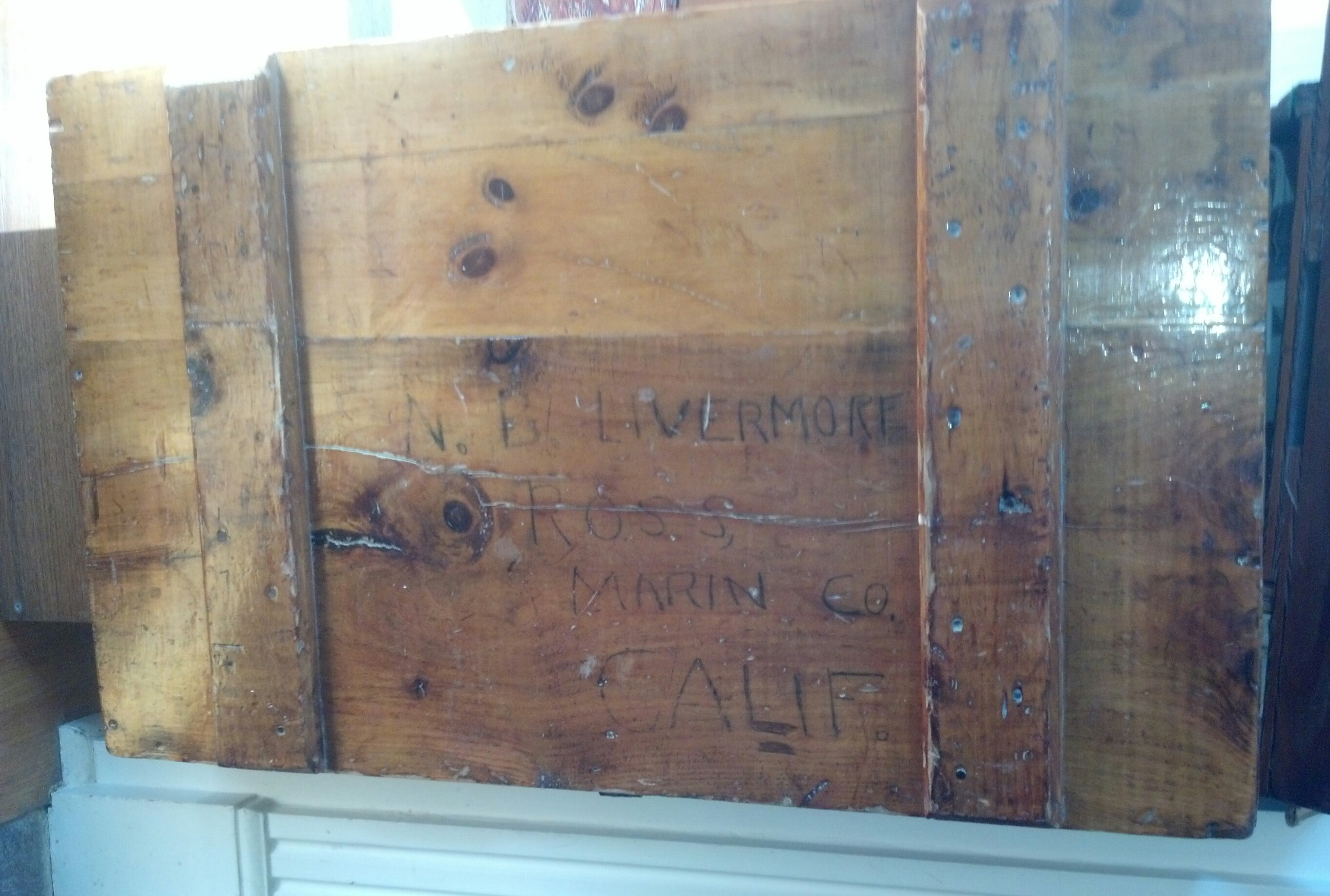
A crate that Norman Livermore used for mule packing

In 1929, Livermore rode a motorcycle up and down the Sierra Nevada, searching for a summer job. On the advice of a park ranger in Sequoia National Park, he was hired at a pack station in Mineral King because of his experience with horses and mules. That first summer, he shod mules, helped the camp cook, and did various chores. The following summer, he began leading mule trains into the wilderness of the High Sierra. The Great Depression hit the pack station business hard, and work was negligible the next two summers. He worked a bit in the summer of 1933, and business picked up for the summer of 1934.

In the fall of 1934, he interviewed the operators of dozens of pack stations throughout the Sierra Nevada, questioning them in depth about their business operations. He compiled a list of 71 pack stations operating in California's wilderness areas. This formed the basis for his MBA thesis at Stanford.

Beginning in 1934, he advocated for a trade group for pack station operators. By 1936, the High Sierra Packers Association had 35 members, and he served as its executive secretary.

In 1937, he bought an interest in the Mineral King Pack Station, and in 1946, bought two pack stations in the eastern Sierra that he merged to form the Mount Whitney Pack Trains. He was the largest wilderness outfitter in the Sierra Nevada for a number of years in the 1940s.

== World War II service ==
Livermore was commissioned a lieutenant in the United States Navy during World War II, and participated in the amphibious landings on Sicily, Iwo Jima, Palau and Okinawa.

== Sierra Club ==
Livermore joined the Sierra Club in the 1930s. He was the outfitter for many of its High Trips and served on the board of directors of the Sierra Club from 1941 to 1949. He came up with the concept for the first of the club's Biennial Wilderness Conferences, which was held on April 8–9, 1949. These conferences continued for more than 20 years.

During a bitter faction fight in 1969, he consulted with opponents of club executive director David Brower, including Ansel Adams and Richard M. Leonard, to develop a plan to restructure the club after Brower's departure. Brower resigned under pressure during a board meeting held May 3–4, 1969.

In 1979, Livermore received the Sierra Club's Walter A. Starr Award for service to the club by a former director.

== Lumberman ==
He served as treasurer for the Pacific Lumber Company from 1952 to 1967, when it was committed to sustainable yields, in the years long before the company was acquired by Maxxam, Inc. and went bankrupt.

== Governor Reagan's cabinet ==
Livermore, who did not know Ronald Reagan before he was elected Governor of California in 1966, was selected to serve as Reagan's Secretary of Resources. A shared love for horseback riding helped cement a relationship between the men. Livermore served from 1967 to 1975, and was the only Reagan cabinet official who served during the entire eight years of Reagan's administration. He developed a close friendship with Reagan during those years.

Livermore convened a meeting between Governor Reagan and Nevada Governor Paul Laxalt that resulted in an agreement to preserve the Lake Tahoe basin.

Livermore worked with Reagan to defeat the proposed Trans-Sierra Highway, which would have divided the longest stretch of wilderness area in the contiguous 48 states and would have bisected the John Muir Trail. Livermore organized a wilderness trip by Ronald Reagan beginning on June 27, 1972. Departing from Red's Meadow near Devils Postpile National Monument, the Reagan party was carried by 100 packhorses. Reagan gave a ringing speech pledging that the Trans-Sierra Highway would never be built. Although Livermore organized the trip, he did not participate in it himself, because he was serving as a U. S. delegate to the 1st United Nations Conference on the Human Environment in Stockholm at the time.

Livermore negotiated the compromise land deal that made it possible for the Reagan administration to endorse the campaign for a Redwoods National Park, leading to its success.

Livermore also convinced Reagan to oppose construction of the Dos Rios Dam on the Eel River in Round Valley, saving the ancestral home of the local Indian tribe. When advocates of the dam urged him to consider facts not emotions, he responded, "Look, emotion is a fact. The solitude of the wilderness, the beauty of a flower – those are facts."

Reagan biographer Lou Cannon said that Livermore succeeded because he "worked with the governor instead of against him. He never criticized Reagan to outsiders, and he wrote letters to newspapers extolling his environmental record. Inside the Cabinet, however, he waged a valiant struggle to educate Reagan on the need to get beyond the minimalist positions of the lumber companies."

Cannon summarized Livermore's legacy, "On environmental issues, Livermore stood in the Republican tradition of Theodore Roosevelt, Hiram Johnson and Earl Warren, all more conservationist than conservative."

Carl Pope of the Sierra Club summarized the organization's opinion of Livermore's performance in the Reagan gubernatorial administration. "He was a real hero in our view. He was largely responsible for the fact that Reagan's environmental record in Sacramento was pretty good, in spite of the fact that Reagan said fairly outrageous things" about environmental issues.

Trusted Reagan advisor Michael Deaver said about Livermore that "He was a valuable member of Ronald Reagan's cabinet. Ike brought tremendous credibility through his efforts in the environment. He was not only a cabinet member but a personal friend (of Reagan). He had great, great respect for Ike."

Environmentalist and author Martin Litton summarized Livermore's role in the Reagan administration, "Ike was a Republican. He was a good person to have there because he was so pro-wilderness. If he had an obsession at all, it was to keep the Sierra Nevada wild for the whole stretch from Tioga Pass in Yosemite National Park south to Walker Pass. And that meant keeping the trans-Sierra roads out of there."

After Reagan was elected President in 1980, Livermore headed his transition team for the Environmental Protection Agency.

== Board service ==
Livermore served on the boards of many organizations, including the National Audubon Society, the Save the Redwoods League, the Thacher School, the Sierra Club, The Peregrine Fund and the Stanford Business School Advisory Council. He served as treasurer of the Commonwealth Club. He chaired the Bureau of Land Management Wild Horse and Burro Commission.

He was a longtime member of the California Fish and Game Commission, and served as its president from 1982 to 1983. While on that body, he worked on recovery of the California condor population.

He served as Grand Marshal of the Bishop Mule Days.

== Hetch Hetchy activism ==
Livermore was a longtime advocate of restoring the Hetch Hetchy Valley in Yosemite National Park by removing O'Shaughnessy Dam. He served on the advisory committee for the grassroots advocacy group "Restore Hetch Hetchy" until his death.

Livermore died in Novato, California, on December 5, 2006.
