= Bishop Mule Days =

Animal show for mules in Bishop, California, US

Bishop Mule Days logo

Bishop Mule Days is an annual multi-day festival celebrating the mule held in Bishop, California centered around Memorial Day weekend. The festival includes mule and packing events, a large non-motorized parade, arts and craft shows, as well as musical concerts.

The event started as a small single-day festival in 1970, originally called Mule Day. It later expanded to several days and was briefly known as World Mule Days before being shortened to Mule Days in 1976. It has since grown to Bishop's largest annual event, attracting as many as 40,000 spectators. The festival has been described as "The Granddaddy of" mule shows.

== History ==
=== 1970 Mule Day ===
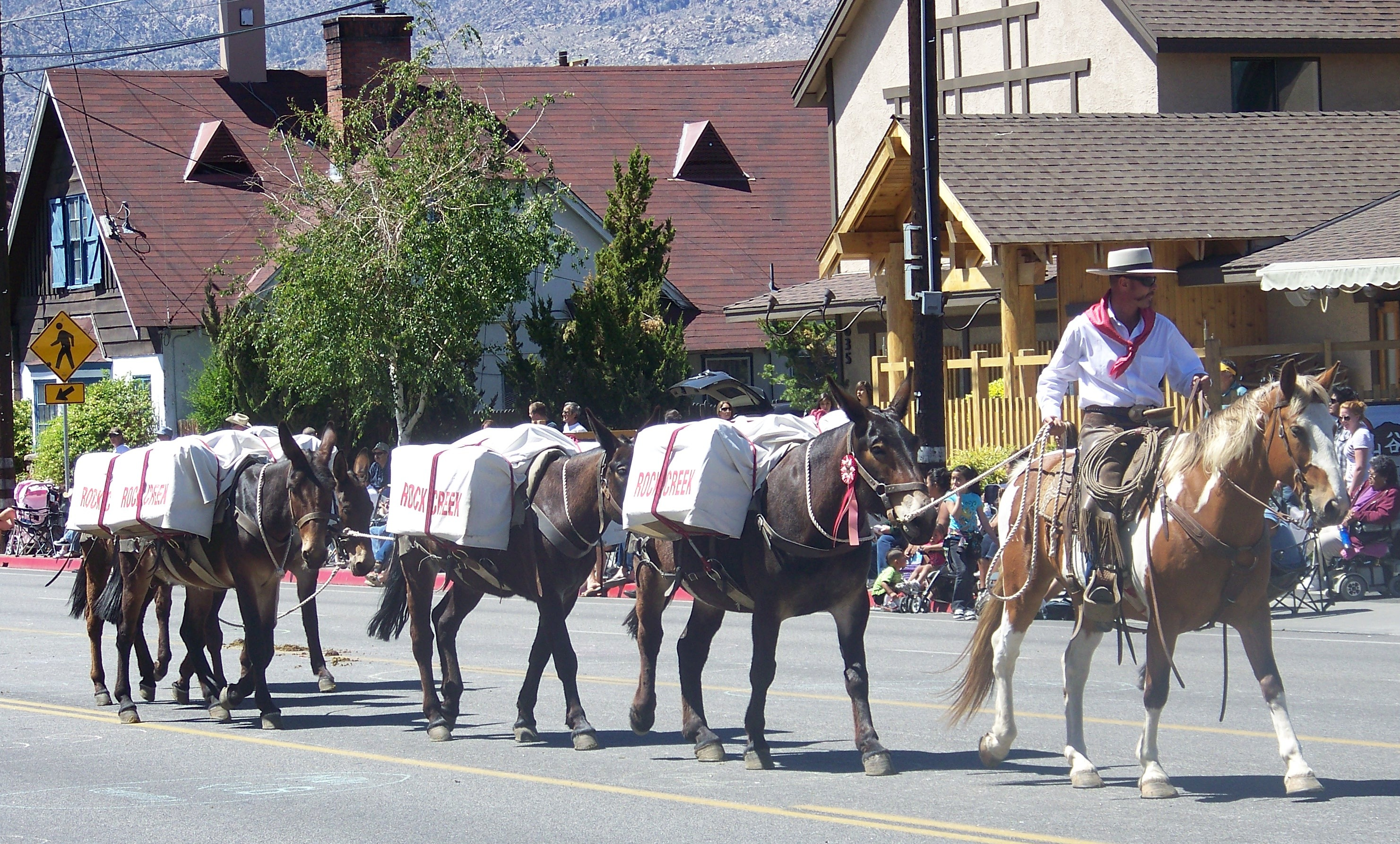
A mule pack string in the Bishop Mule Days parade.

The festival first took place in Bishop on 30 May 1970 as Mule Day, named so because it occurred on a single day. It was organized by the Eastern Sierra Packers Association. The event included a mule and horse parade on Main Street whose grand marshal was Slim Tatum, notable as an "Owens Valley pioneer, former packer and well known Eastern Sierra rancher."

The first Mule Day included a number of events at Bishop's Tri-County Fairgrounds, including a barbecue, a gymkhana (equestrian time trials), as well as a "mule and packing show." Although it is unclear exactly how many attended activities at the fairgrounds, the Inyo Independent reported that the parade was seen "by thousands."

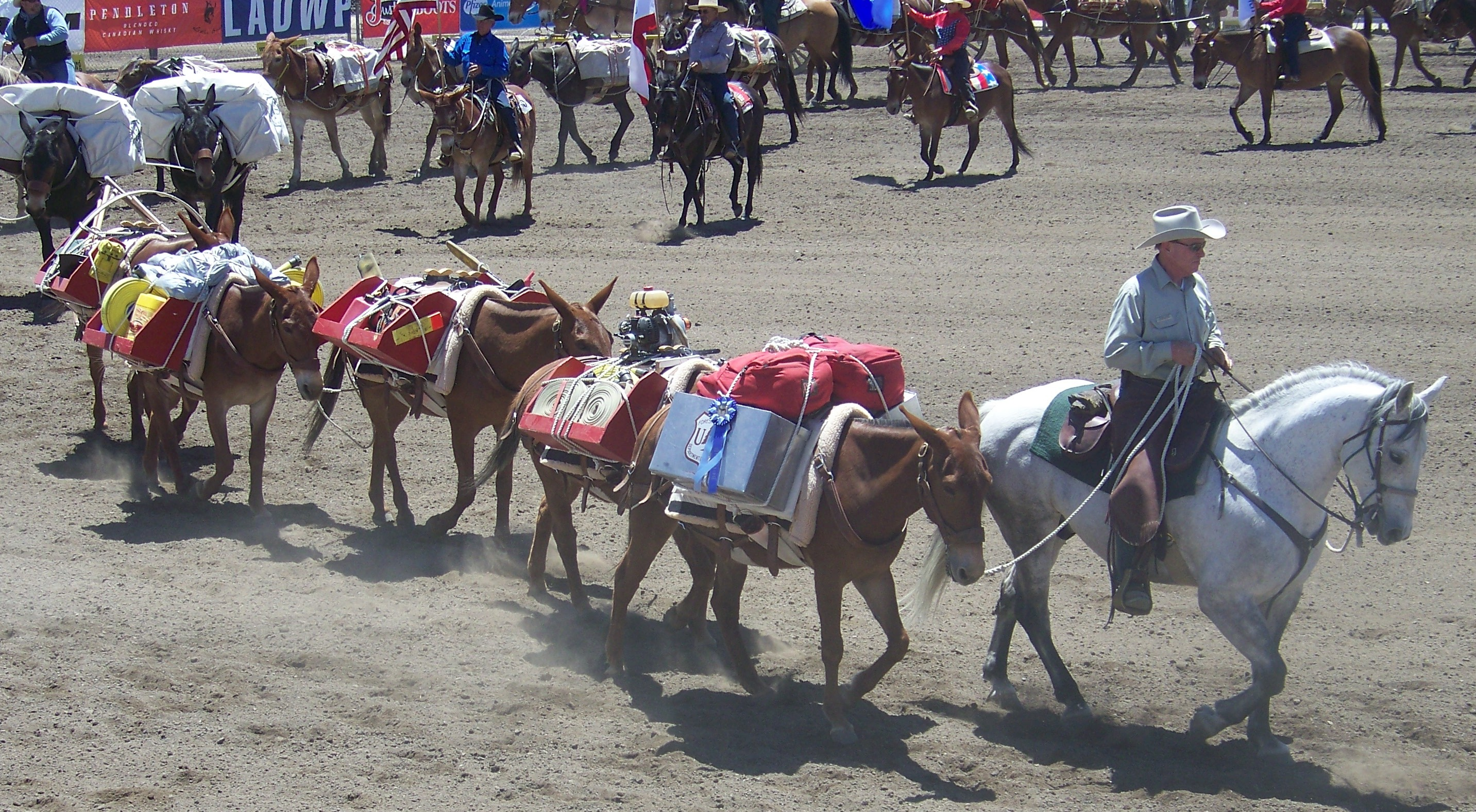
A mule pack string operated by the United States Forest Service, carrying firefighting gear, and participating in Bishop Mule Days.

=== Later years ===
In 1972, the festival spread to two days of events, and was renamed World Mule Days. In 1976, the name was simplified to Mule Days.

Mule Days eventually grew to become Bishop's largest event, attracting as many as 30,000 spectators. Recent years have seen 700 mules compete in 181 events and the largest non-motorized parade in the United States. Bob Tallman has been the senior announcer of Bishop Mule Days for over 20 years.

2020 saw the COVID-19 pandemic as grounds for cancellation & deferral to 2021.

== Parade ==
The annual Bishop Mule Days parade takes place on the Saturday morning before Memorial Day. The parade route runs north on U.S. Route 395 through downtown Bishop. No motorized vehicles or floats are allowed; all entries must either be on foot, or use mules or horses. The 2010 parade had 110 units, including 18 mule pack strings from commercial pack stations and government agencies including the United States Forest Service, the National Park Service and the Mountain Warfare Training Center operated by the United States Marine Corps. Many historic mule-drawn and horse-drawn vehicles participate. Although most parade units are from California, units from Idaho, Nevada, Iowa, Arizona, Oregon and Utah participated in 2010.

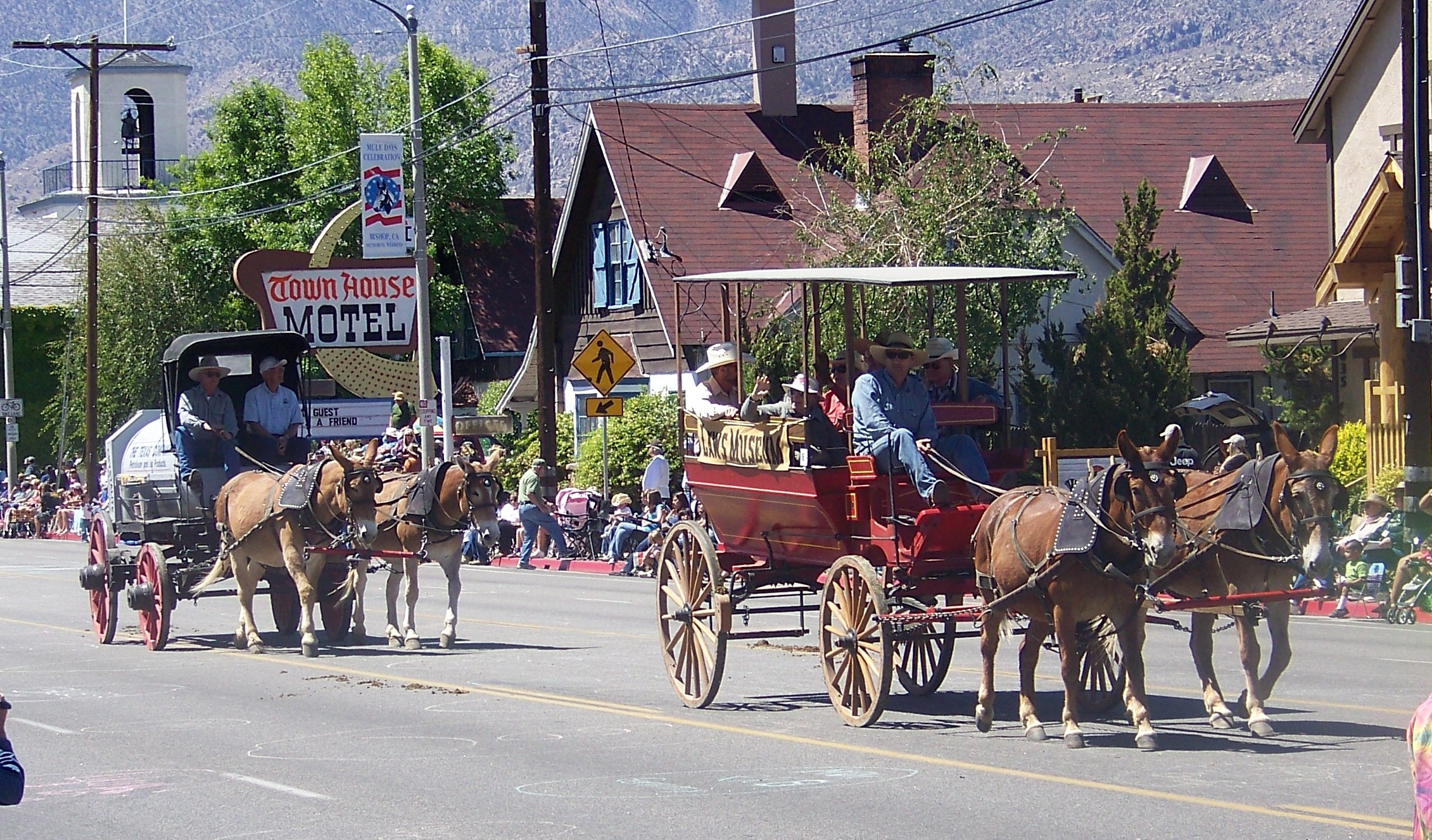
Two mule-drawn wagons in the Bishop Mule Days parade.

On the event of the 50th anniversary in 2019, a twenty-mule team hauled a reproduction train of borax wagons. The two borax wagons and water wagon were built over a period of several years in the 2010s at Engels Coach Shop in Joliet, Montana, accurately copying the originals that are on display at Furnace Creek in Death Valley, California.

=== Notable attendees ===
Celebrities, mule packers, politicians, actors, and park rangers have acted as the Mule Days parade grand marshals. Ronald Reagan, who was the sitting Governor of California at the time, acted as the parade's grand marshal in 1974. The Bridgeport Chronicle-Union estimated that 40,000 were in attendance to view Reagan in the parade.

Other grand marshals of the parade have included environmentalist and Reagan cabinet member Norman Livermore, athlete and congressman Bob Mathias, National Park Service director Horace Albright, and character actor Slim Pickens.

The featured musical performer in 2010 was Lonestar and country star Jerrod Niemann performed in 2013.

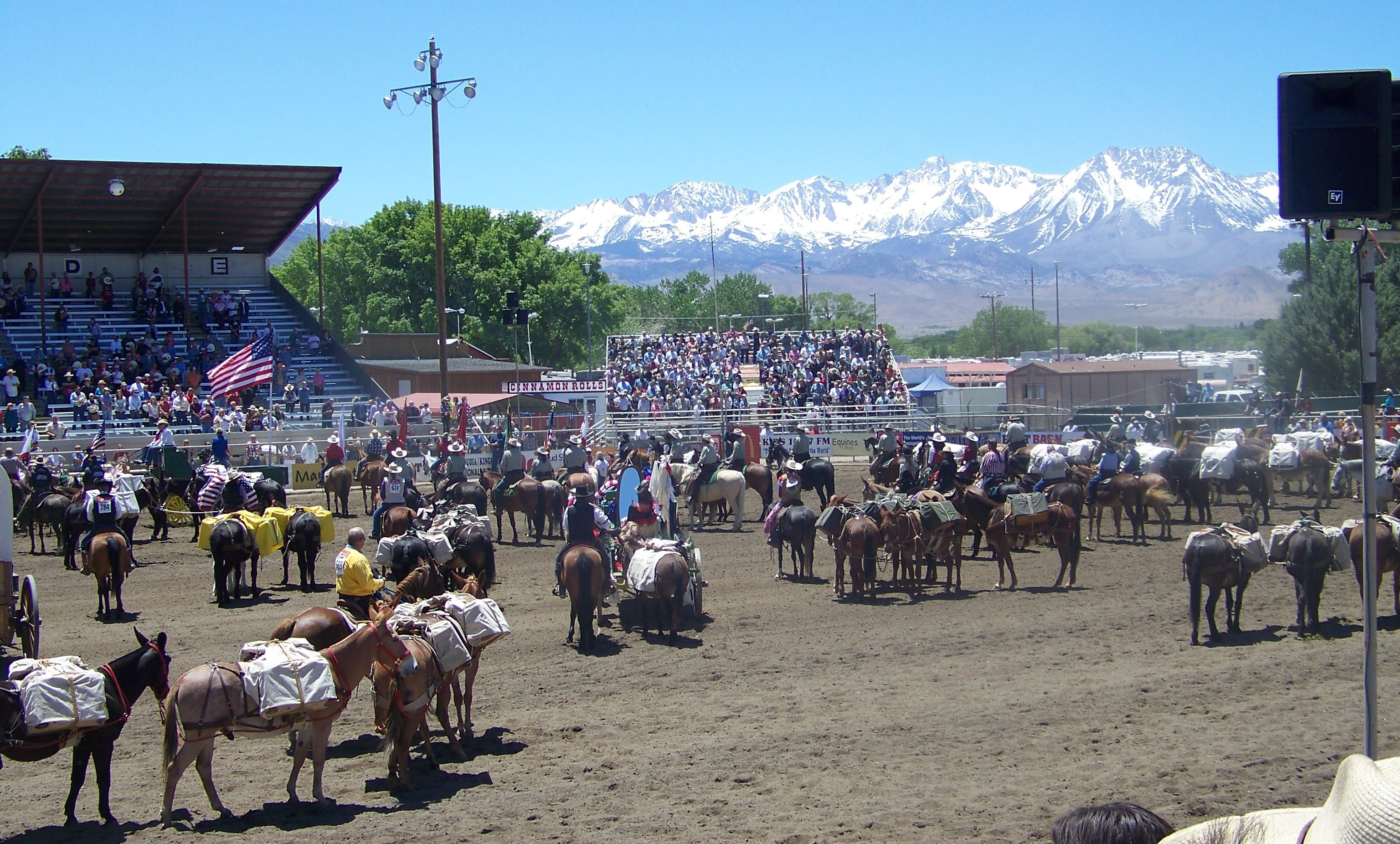
Participants in the Bishop Mule Days stand for the Star Spangled Banner, with the Sierra Nevada in the background.

== Competitive Events ==
Competitive events take place over a six-day period at the Tri-County Fairgrounds in Bishop. "A full slate of competitive events is featured, including events such as barrel racing, calf roping, steer stopping, cow penning, flat racing, and carriage driving. Activities also range from packing to dressage, and from team chariot racing to mule shoeing contests." There were nearly 220 classes in 2010.

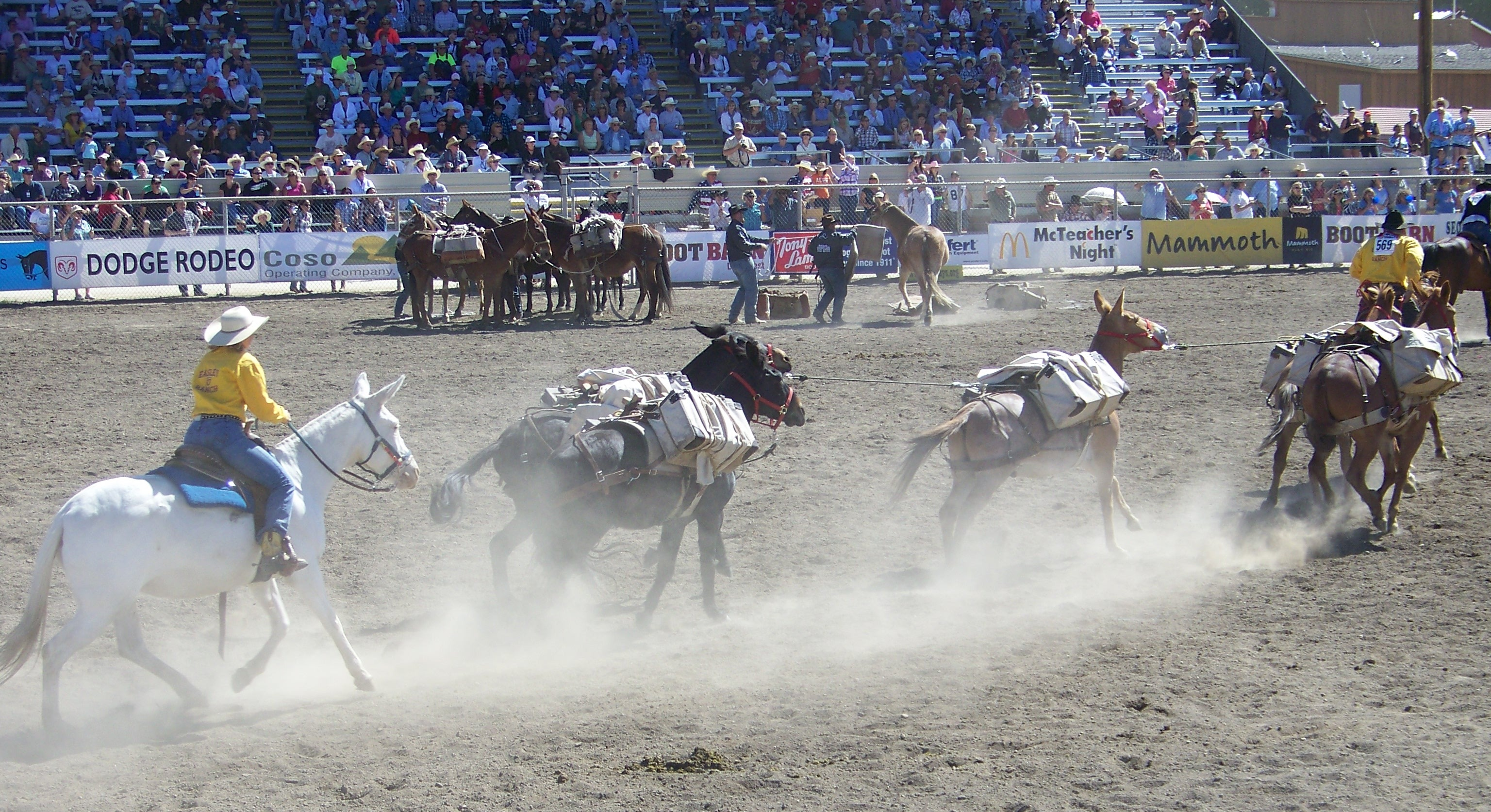
The first pack string to reassemble and run out of the arena is the winner of the packing scramble.

=== Packing Scramble ===
The packing scramble is a competitive event unique to Bishop Mule Days. Mule pack strings enter the arena, and are unloaded and untethered. Rodeo cowboys then stampede the herd, firing blank gunshots. The event is described as a "wild and wooly spectacular" with "more than one hundred horses and mules running loose in the arena." "Teams of professional backcountry packers compete against each other for bragging rights. Each team must wrangle its own mules out of a herd in the arena, pack them correctly, and race around to the finish line as spectators whoop, cheer and jeer." The winning team is the one that is first to reassemble and reload its pack string, and lead it out of the arena.
