= 1938 Amateur World Series =

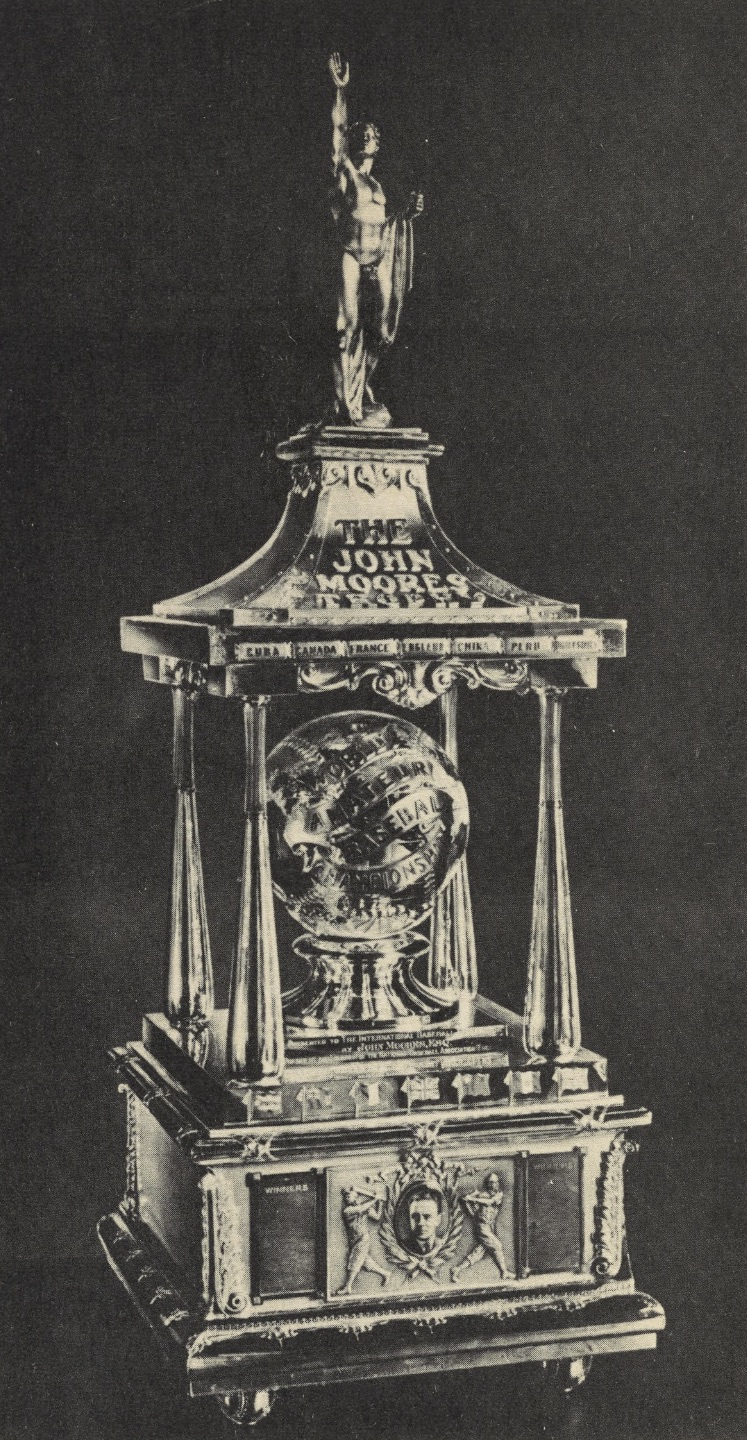
- The John Moores Cup

Tournament details
- Country: Great Britain
- Venues: 5 (in 5 host cities)
- Dates: 13–20 August
- Teams: 2

Final positions
- Champions: Great Britain (1st title)
- Runners-up: United States

Tournament statistics
- Games played: 5

The 1938 Amateur World Series was the inaugural Amateur World Series, the first edition of the tournament that would eventually become the Baseball World Cup. Originally known as the John Moores Cup, it was contested by the United States and Great Britain over a series of five games from August 13 to 20 in five different cities in England. The tournament was won by Great Britain, four games to one.

Two future Major League Baseball players, Mike "Lefty" Schemer and Mizell "Whitey" Platt, participated in the tournament on the United States team.

It was Britain's last international gold medal in baseball for 87 years, when the national under-23 team won the 2025 European Under-23 Baseball Championship.

== Background ==
After managing to include baseball as a demonstration sport at the 1936 Berlin Olympics, International Baseball Federation (IBF) president Leslie Mann, sought to establish an international tournament for national teams (which, at that time, were entirely composed of non-professional amateur players, in the spirit of the Olympics). Mann had first tried to set up a tournament between the national teams of the United States and Japan in 1937, but was prevented by the outbreak of the Second Sino-Japanese War that same year.

Instead, Mann wrote to John Moores, president of the British National Baseball Association (the precursor to the modern British Baseball Federation) to organize a tournament between the U.S. and Great Britain teams. Though baseball was not overwhelmingly popular in Britain, Moores' efforts to develop baseball in Britain had earned the admiration of many prominent American baseball executives, including National League president John Heydler.

Moores had established a friendly working relationship with the U.S Amateur Baseball Congress (USABC) sent six players across the Atlantic as baseball instructors the year before. Mann had long hoped to establish an international tournament "that would be emblematical of the World's title, the same as the Davis Cup is to Tennis; the Ryder Cup to Golf; the Stanley Cup to Hockey."

The USABC held trials for the United States national team in Lincoln, Nebraska, with over fifty young players in attendance. England selected their team mostly from the professional Yorkshire-Lancashire League, which in those days was attracting crowds of 10,000 people, though many of the players were Canadian. (Note: Baseball researcher Peter C. Bjarkman, in his account of the Amateur World Series tournaments, erroneously described the rosters on both sides of the 1938 series as "American soldiers currently on duty at European military bases." The U.S. team did play an exhibition game against Royal Air Force servicemen at RAF Halton after the main series of test matches had concluded.) Until the advent of the Canadian Citizenship Act, 1946, Canadians had the status of British subjects and would be eligible to compete for Great Britain.

== Participants ==
- Great Britain
- United States

== Venues ==
1938 Amateur World Series (England)	City	Stadium
1938 Amateur World Series (England)	Liverpool	Wavertree Stadium
1938 Amateur World Series (England)	Kingston upon Hull	Old Craven Park
1938 Amateur World Series (England)	Rochdale	Spotland Stadium
1938 Amateur World Series (England)	Halifax	The Shay
1938 Amateur World Series (England)	Leeds	Headingley Stadium

== Tournament summary ==
=== Game 1 ===
August 13, 1938 at Wavertree Stadium in Liverpool
Team	1	2	3	4	5	6	7	8	9	R
Great Britain	0	0	0	0	0	0	1	2	0	3
United States	0	0	0	0	0	0	0	0	0	0
WP: Ross Kendrick LP: Virgil Thompson; Home runs: GBR: Danny Wright; USA: None; Attendance: 10,000

The first "test match" was played at Wavertree Stadium in Liverpool on August 13. Before a crowd of 10,000, Canadian-born ace Ross Kendrick struck out 16 American batters, out-dueling curveballer Virgil Thompson. Britain's Danny Wright hit a home run in the seventh inning; in the eighth, Sam Hanna doubled off of Thompson to knock in Sid Bissett, and Larry Marsh singled to bring in player-manager McNeil for a 3–0 Great Britain win.

=== Game 2 ===
August 15, 1938 at Old Craven Park, Kingston upon Hull
Team	1	2	3	4	5	6	7	8	9	R
Great Britain	0	1	0	0	5	0	1	1	0	8
United States	2	0	0	0	0	0	2	2	0	6
Home runs: GBR: Sam Hanna; USA: None; Attendance: 5,000

On August 15, the series moved to Old Craven Park in Kingston upon Hull, the home of Hull Kingston Rovers rugby league club. The US opened the scoring with two runs from George Binger and Tommy O'Rourke. Great Britain's Danny Cadorette scored in the second, and a five-run fifth inning, highlighted by a two-run homer by shortstop Sam Hanna, saw Britain firmly take the lead. The U.S. scored two more runs in the seventh and eighth, but a rally in the ninth was cut short when O'Rourke was caught out, leaving two men on base, and delivering Britain the 8–6 win and putting them on the cusp of a series victory.

=== Game 3 ===
August 17, 1938 at Spotland Stadium, Rochdale
Team	1	2	3	4	5	6	7	8	9	R
Great Britain	0	0	0	0	0	0	0	0	0	0
United States	1	1	0	0	0	0	3	0	0	5
WP: Clyde Dean LP: Sid Bissett; Attendance: 1,000

The third game of the series was played at Spotland, home of Rochdale A.F.C., and turned out to be the United States' sole victory. However, this game attracted only about 1,000 spectators, due to uncertain weather and the lack of Britain's U.S.-born players. The U.S. shut out Great Britain 5–0, in a game noted for its defensive plays on the side of the Americans.

=== Game 4 ===
August 19, 1938 at The Shay, Halifax
Team	1	2	3	4	5	6	7	8	9	R
Great Britain	0	1	0	3	0	0	0	0	X	4
United States	0	0	0	0	0	0	0	0	X	0
WP: Ross Kendrick LP: Home runs: GBR: Chummy McNeil; USA: None; Attendance: 5,000

The best-of-five series then moved to The Shay in Halifax, home of Halifax Town Football Club. Despite hopes of the biggest crowd to date, the game drew only 5,000 spectators. Again, Kendrick shone for the British side, striking out 12 and allowing only three singles. McNeil homered in the second to put Britain ahead. In the fourth, Hanna walked, Kendrick singled, Cadorette got on base through an error. Wright singled to bring home Hanna and Kendrick, then Benson singled to score Cadorette. Controversially, the game was called during the ninth inning due to bad light, giving Great Britain the 4–0 win and clinching the title.

=== Game 5 ===
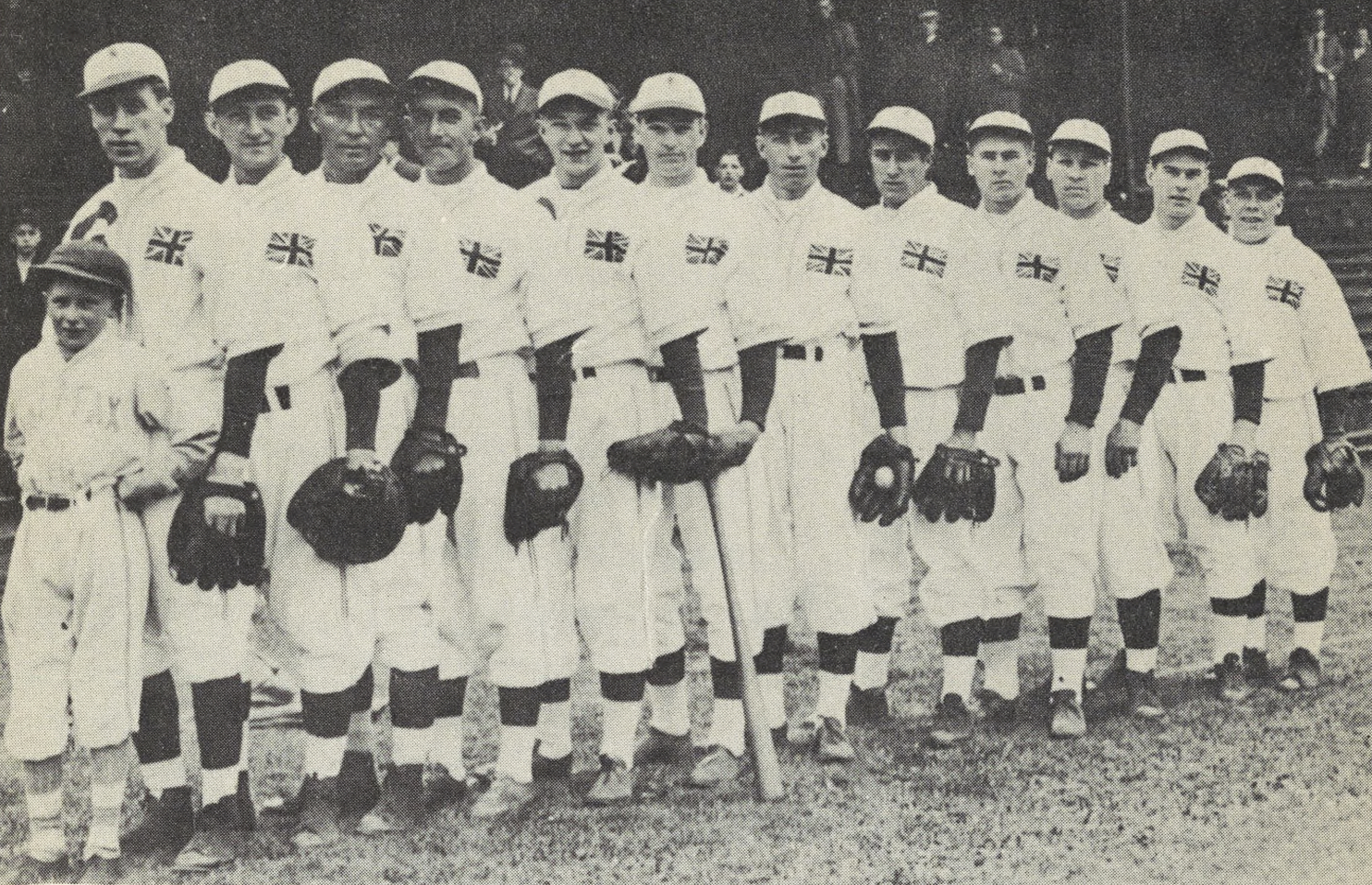
The world champion Great Britain team

The fifth game of the series was played the next day in Leeds at the Headingley Stadium, the home of Leeds Rugby League Club. The game did not attract much interest, and Britain won 5–3 in six innings, after which the game was called due to rain. (Note: No linescore for Game 5 is provided by Smyth.)

== Final standings ==
Pos	Team	Pld	W	L	RF	RA	RD	PCT	GB
1	Great Britain (H)	5	4	1	20	14	+6	.800	—
2	United States	5	1	4	14	20	−6	.200	3

Source: Smyth, pp. 131–33
(H) Hosts

== Rosters ==
=== Great Britain ===
Player/manager: Chummy McNeil

Pos.	Player	Club
C	Irvine Ruvinsky	London
1B	Ken Robinson	Oldham
2B	Sid Bissett	Birmingham
3B	Chummy McNeil (mgr.)	Leeds
SS	Sam Hanna	Halifax
RF	Frank Cadorette	Halifax
CF	Danny Wright	Halifax
LF	Jack Ritchie	Liverpool
P	Ross Kendrick	Oldham
—	Jerry Strong	Hull
—	Doc Holden	Bradford
—	Larry Marsh	Hull

=== United States ===
Manager: Leslie Mann

Pos.	Player
C	Dean Graff (cpt.)
1B	Lefty Schemer
2B	Leo Benson
3B	John McDermott
SS	Tommy O'Rourke
RF	George Binger
CF	Lloyd Johnson
LF	Whitey Platt
P	Virgil Thompson
P	Clyde "Dizzy" Dean
—	Charles Tate
—	Ora Linda
—	Wendell Ringland

== Bibliography ==
- Josh Chetwynd (2019). Baseball in Europe. McFarland & Company. ISBN 978-1-4766-7912-9.
- "1938: World Cup versus USA in Great Britain". Project Cobb. Project for the Chronicling of British Baseball.
