= Jacksonville Sharks (WFL) =

Former American football team in the WFL

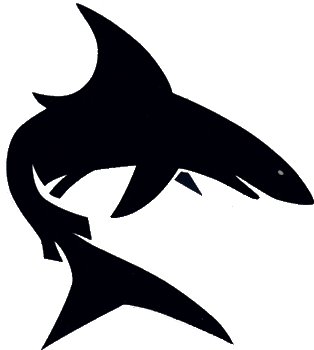
Logo

General information
- Founded: January 1974
- Folded: September 1974
- Stadium: Gator Bowl Stadium
- Headquartered: Jacksonville, Florida
- Colours: Black and silver

Personnel
- Owner: Fran Monaco
- Head coach: Bud Asher; Charlie Tate

League / conference affiliations
- World Football League; Eastern Division

The Jacksonville Sharks were a professional American football team based in Jacksonville, Florida which competed in the World Football League in 1974. The Sharks folded during the 1974 season due to financial difficulties, and were succeeded by the Jacksonville Express which also folded when the league ceased operations during the 1975 season.

== History ==
The Sharks were one of the original franchises of the World Football League, a failed attempt to launch a major professional football league in the United States in competition with the National Football League. In 1974, the team played seven home games at the Gator Bowl Stadium in Jacksonville. The Sharks roster was a mixture of rookies such as Mike Townsend, Eddie McAshan and Reggie Oliver, and veterans like Ike Lassiter, John Stofa, Drew Buie, and former University of Florida All-American lineman Larry Gagner. Six weeks into the season, the team had a 2–4 record, and owner Fran Monaco fired head coach Bud Asher—who had actually loaned Monaco $27,000 a few weeks earlier in order to meet payroll. The Sharks did not improve under new coach Charlie Tate, however, losing six of their remaining eight games.

Despite their mediocre play on the field, the Sharks reported that they were second in the league in attendance. The front office claimed to have sold 18,000 season tickets, and listed attendance numbers of 59,112 for the home opener against the New York Stars and 46,780 for their second home game against the Southern California Sun. However, in a similar situation to that in Philadelphia, the club later admitted to giving away 44,000 tickets for the first two games and distributing many thousands more free or sharply discounted tickets for subsequent home games. As with several WFL teams, declining real ticket sales coupled with uncontrolled spending led to serious cash flow problems. The team also dealt with some infrastructure problems: while on national television, the power failed at the Gator Bowl during the team's game against the New York Stars on July 11, forcing the game to be delayed while power was restored to the lights.

Monaco tried to sell the team to New York financier William Pease; however, after it emerged that Pease was under indictment regarding a Connecticut land deal, the WFL took over the franchise on September 22. The players, who had not been paid for over a month, threatened not to fly to Anaheim to play the Southern California Sun. League Commissioner Gary Davidson paid them $65,000 in escrow and the players made the trip. A week later, after vetoing several prospective owners, the WFL folded the team (as well as the hapless Detroit Wheels), and the Sharks' last six games were cancelled.

Today, the name is used by the Indoor Football League's Jacksonville Sharks, which began play in the Arena Football League in 2010.

== Schedule and results ==
Key:	Win	Loss	Bye

=== 1974 regular season ===
Week	Day	Date	Opponent	Result	Attendance
1	Thursday	July 11, 1974	New York Stars	W 14–7	59,112
2	Wednesday	July 17, 1974	at Chicago Fire	L 22–25	29,308
3	Wednesday	July 24, 1974	Southern California Sun	L 19–21	46,780
4	Wednesday	July 31, 1974	at New York Stars	L 16–24	15,648
5	Thursday	August 8, 1974	Hawaiians	W 21–14	43,869
6	Wednesday	August 14, 1974	at Florida Blazers	L 26–33	23,890
7	Wednesday	August 21, 1974	Birmingham Americans	L 14–15	27,140
8	Sunday	August 25, 1974	at Hawaiians	W 14–8	10,099
9	Monday	September 2, 1974	Memphis Southmen	L 13–16	22,169
10	Thursday	September 5, 1974	Philadelphia Bell	W 34–30	17,851
11	Wednesday	September 11, 1974	at Philadelphia Bell	L 22–41 (OT)	N/A
12	Wednesday	September 18, 1974	Portland Storm	L 17–19	16,041
13	Wednesday	September 25, 1974	at Southern California Sun	L 7–57	22,017
14	Wednesday	October 2, 1974	at Memphis Southmen	L 19–47	15,016
15	Wednesday	October 9, 1974	Florida Blazers		cancelled
16	Wednesday	October 16, 1974	at Portland Storm		cancelled
17	Wednesday	October 23, 1974	at Birmingham Americans		cancelled
18	Wednesday	October 30, 1974	Detroit Wheels		cancelled
19	Wednesday	November 6, 1974	at Shreveport Steamer		cancelled
20	Wednesday	November 13, 1974	Chicago Fire		cancelled

== See also ==
- 1974 World Football League season
- Jacksonville Express
