= Tracy City, Tennessee =

- Town
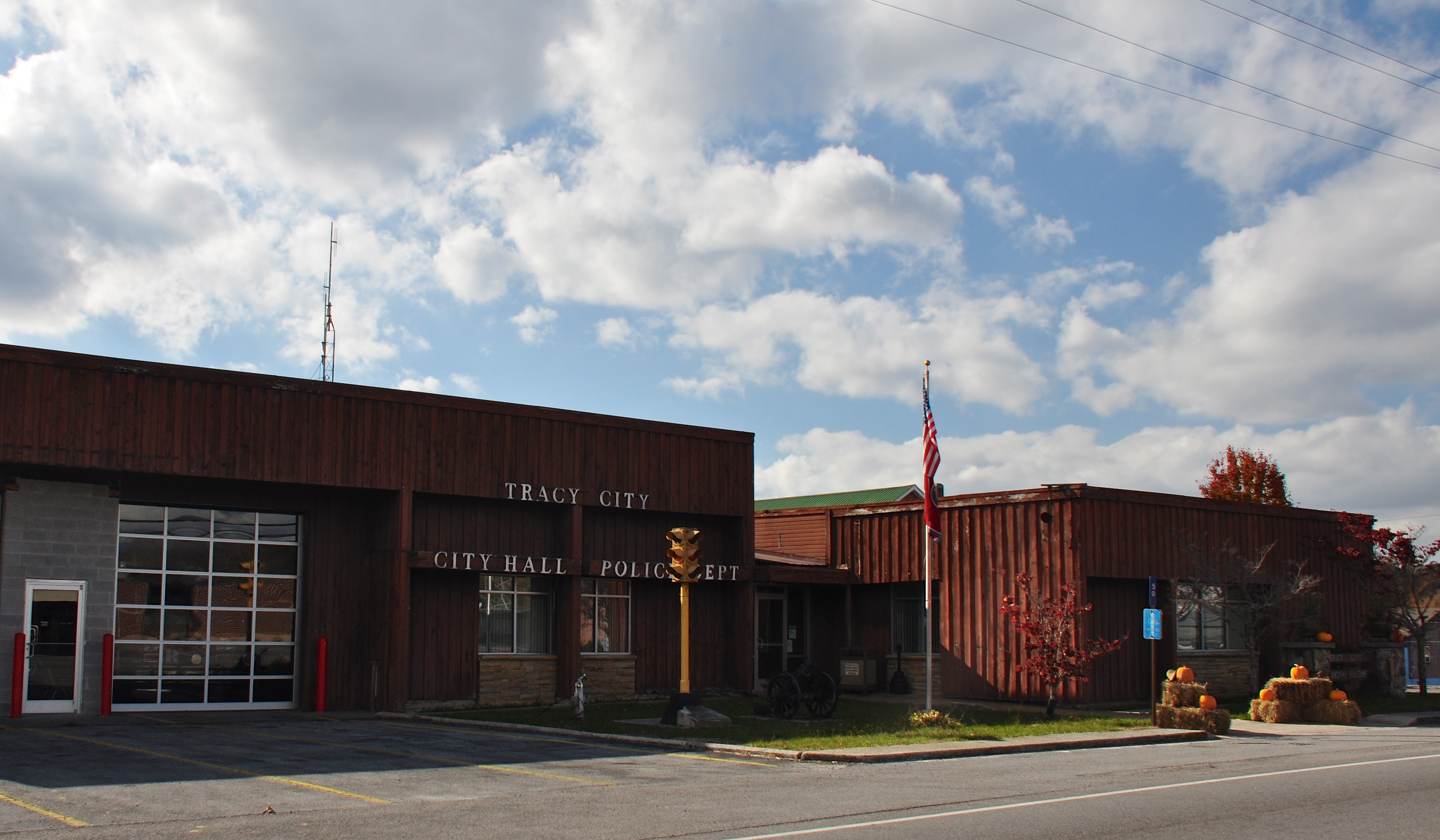
- Tracy City City Hall, November 2014.

- Location of Tracy City in Grundy County, Tennessee.
- Coordinates: 35°15′39″N 85°44′30″W
- Country: United States
- State: Tennessee
- County: Grundy
- Established: 1850s
- Incorporated: 1915
- Named after: Samuel Franklin Tracy

Area
  - Total: 4.77 sq mi (12.36 km^{2})
  - Land: 4.66 sq mi (12.06 km^{2})
  - Water: 0.12 sq mi (0.30 km^{2})
- Elevation: 1,828 ft (557 m)

Population (2020)
  - Total: 1,406
  - Density: 302/sq mi (116.6/km^{2})
- Time zone: UTC-6 (Central (CST))
  - Summer (DST): UTC-5 (CDT)
- ZIP code: 37387
- Area code: 931
- FIPS code: 47-74880
- GNIS feature ID: 1304149

Tracy City is a town in Grundy County, Tennessee, United States. Incorporated in 1915, As of the 2020 census, Tracy City had a population of 1,406. It is named after financier Samuel Franklin Tracy, the city developed out of railroad and mining interests after coal was found in 1840. In 2010 the people of Tracy City elected a dead man, Carl Robin Geary, as mayor.

== History ==
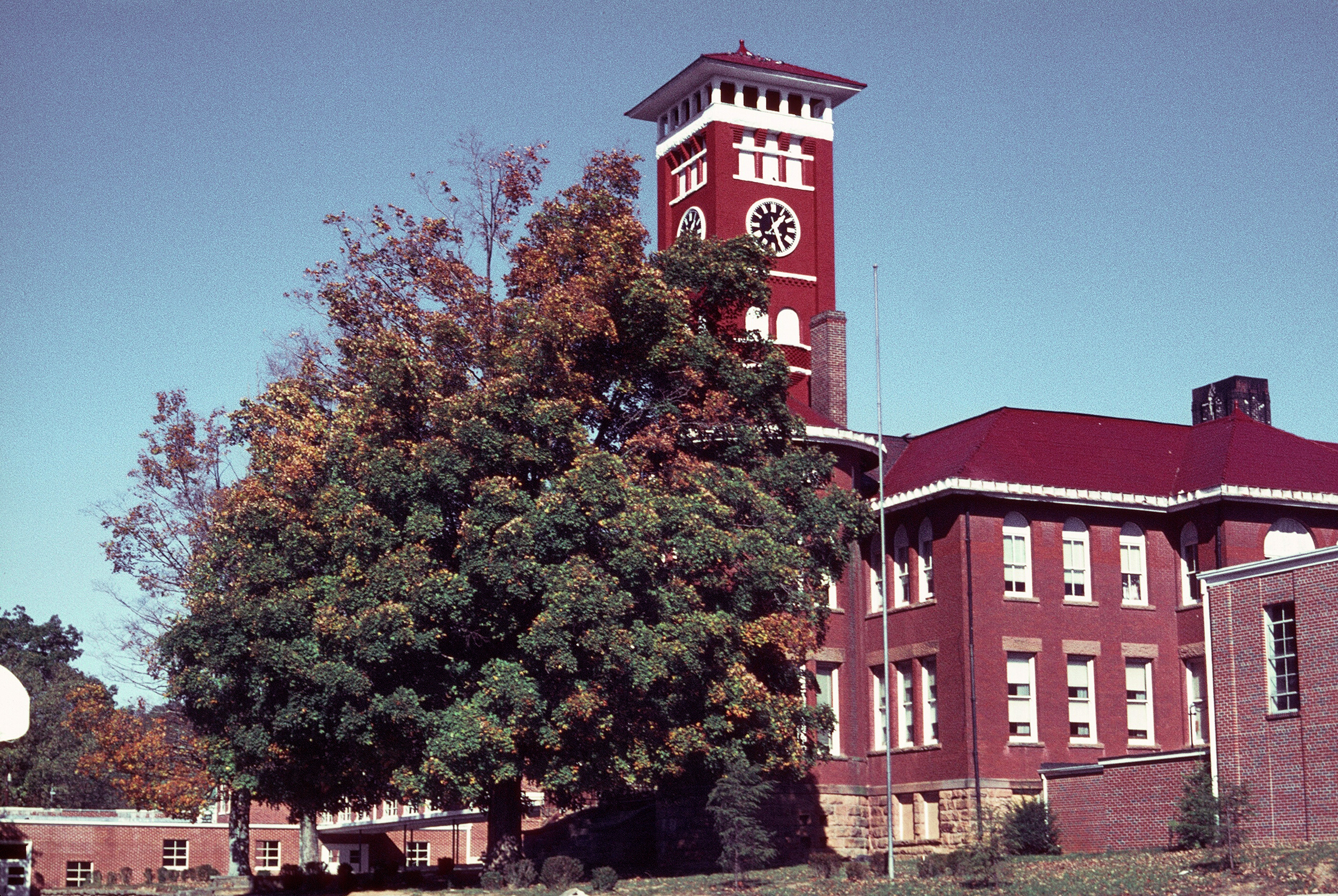
Arsonists destroyed Tracy City's James K. Shook School in 1976 after this 1971 photo.

In 1840 local boys digging a groundhog out of the ground discovered coal. In the early 1870s Tracy City an experimental blast furnace was built by Samuel Jones and owned by the Tennessee Coal, Iron and Railroad Company. The furnace, called "Fiery Gizzard", was built to see if local coal would be used to produce iron. The furnace made 15 tons of iron before the stovepipe fell on the third day. The former location of the furnace is marked with a historical marker. The coke ovens at Tracy City supplied railroad and industrial fuel and workers and their families moved into the area in great numbers from 1875 until 1900. By 1910 the industry faded due to problems invoked by labor unions and convict labor. Tracy City is also home to the oldest family bakery in Tennessee, Dutch Maid Bakery. In 1987 the coke ovens were placed on the National Register of Historic Places. Tracy City was incorporated in 1915.

Tracy City has featured prominently in Grundy County's history of arson. Ten buildings in the business district were set alight in 1935. The 100-year-old L&N Depot, 86-year-old James K. Shook School, various waterworks, schools, a lumber yard, and a doctor's clinic were also torched in the 20th century. This tradition has continued into the 21st century. On April 8, 2022, there was an arson attempt at the Historic Christ Church Episcopal on 10th Street in Tracy City.

== Geography ==
Tracy City is located at 35°15′39″N 85°44′30″W. According to the United States Census Bureau, the town has a total area of 4.8 square miles (12 km^{2}), of which 4.8 square miles (12 km^{2}) is land and 0.04 square miles (0.10 km^{2}) (0.83%) is water.

== Demographics ==
Historical population
Census	Pop.	Note	%±
1890	1,936		—
1950	1,414		—
1960	1,577		11.5%
1970	1,388		−12.0%
1980	1,444		4.0%
1990	1,556		7.8%
2000	1,679		7.9%
2010	1,481		−11.8%
2020	1,406		−5.1%

=== 2020 census ===
Tracy City racial composition
Race	Number	Percentage
White (non-Hispanic)	1,278	90.9%
Black or African American (non-Hispanic)	30	2.13%
Native American	2	0.14%
Asian	11	0.78%
Other/Mixed	84	5.97%
Hispanic or Latino	30	2.13%

As of the 2020 United States census, there were 1,406 people, 614 households, and 390 families residing in the town.

=== 2000 census ===
As of the census of 2000, there were 1,679 people, 712 households, and 474 families residing in the town. The population density was 350.8 inhabitants per square mile (135.4/km^{2}). There were 775 housing units at an average density of 161.9 per square mile (62.5/km^{2}). The racial makeup of the town was 98.09% White, 0.71% Native American, 0.06% Asian, 0.30% from other races, and 0.83% from two or more races. Hispanic or Latino of any race were 0.60% of the population.

There were 712 households, out of which 31.6% had children under the age of 18 living with them, 51.4% were married couples living together, 11.0% had a female householder with no husband present, and 33.3% were non-families. 29.6% of all households were made up of individuals, and 13.6% had someone living alone who was 65 years of age or older. The average household size was 2.36 and the average family size was 2.92.

In the town, the population was spread out, with 24.5% under the age of 18, 7.1% from 18 to 24, 26.7% from 25 to 44, 24.5% from 45 to 64, and 17.1% who were 65 years of age or older. The median age was 38 years. For every 100 females, there were 95.7 males. For every 100 females age 18 and over, there were 90.0 males.

The median income for a household in the town was $23,826, and the median income for a family was $28,864. Males had a median income of $28,563 versus $18,571 for females. The per capita income for the town was $15,457. About 17.5% of families and 21.7% of the population were below the poverty line, including 26.6% of those under age 18 and 21.2% of those age 65 or over.

== Economy ==
Tracy City is home to the Dutch Maid Bakery, the oldest family bakery in Tennessee. It was opened in 1902 by John Baggenstoss and continues to utilize original recipes that Baggenstoss brought from Switzerland. The bakery is open to the public. The Marugg Company is headquartered in Tracy City. The company, founded in 1873 by Swiss settler Christian Marugg, designs and manufactures European style scythes. Open to the public for tours, the Marugg Company was placed on the National Register of Historic Places in 1987.

== Arts and culture ==
Tracy City serves as the location of the Grundy County Historical Society and Tracy City Library. The city has one art gallery named "The Nature Works" which focuses solely on nature and wildlife. Twelve churches are located in Tracy City, including the Tracy City First Baptist Church, which was founded in 1892.

== Parks and recreation ==
Tracy City is at one end of the Fiery Gizzard Trail, known for its scenery and ranked in the top 25 backpacking trails in the United States by Backpacker magazine.

The town has a road side picnic area and Tracy City Mini Park. The town also has a community center, the Plainview Community Center.

Grundy Lakes State Park is in Tracy City.

== Government ==
In 2010 Tracy City residents elected recently deceased Carl Robin Geary as mayor. Geary died of a heart attack on March 10, and on April 12 he was elected, beating incumbent Barbara Bock 268 votes to 85. When asked what would come of her political career after losing to a dead man, Mrs Brock replied: "I'll live," she said. "I'm a survivor."

The mayoral seat to which Mr Geary was elected was declared vacant and the city's four aldermen selected a new mayor.

== Notable people ==
American college football player and University of Miami coach Charlie Tate was born in Tracy City. Miss Tennessee 1939 Judy Jones was from Tracy City. Baseball player Phil Douglas is buried in Tracy City Cemetery, even though he died in Sequatchie, Tennessee.

Ernst Leonhardt was born to a Swiss emigrant couple in Tracy City in September 1885. He held dual citizenship and returned to Switzerland as a child. Leonhardt became involved in politics in 1932 when he joined the National Front, and before long he had risen to the rank of Gauführer (equivalent to Gauleiter) in both Basel-City and the Canton of Solothurn. Leonhardt relocated to Germany in 1939 and continued his pro-Nazi activism from there. In his absence, the Swiss courts found Leonhardt guilty of attacking the Swiss Confederation's independence and illegally recruiting for a foreign military (i. e. the SS) and was sentenced to fifteen and a half years in prison. His Swiss citizenship was revoked in 1943. He remained in Germany for the rest of his life, continuing to produce propaganda. He was killed in an air raid in March 1945.

== See also ==
- List of towns in Tennessee
