= Ross Kendrick =

British baseball player (1909–1975)

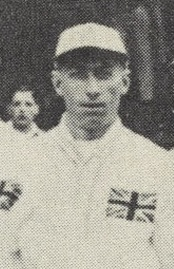
- Pitcher
- Born: August 25, 1909; Merrickville, Ontario, Canada
- Died: January 19, 1975 (aged 65); Birmingham, England
- Batted: Right Threw: Right
Medals
Representing Great Britain
Amateur World Series
Gold medal – first place	1938 Great Britain	Team

Ross Kendrick (August 25, 1909 – January 19, 1975) was a Canadian-born British baseball pitcher who was active during the golden age of baseball in the United Kingdom. He played for Great Britain in the inaugural 1938 Amateur World Series.

== Playing career ==
Kendrick played with the semi-pro Smith Falls club of the Canadian–American League in 1936. He was recruited by John Moores, a British businessman and baseball executive, to come play professionally in Britain; he abandoned his Canadian wife and three children to play in the U.K.

He began his career in the British league with the York Maroons of the Yorkshire League in 1937. The following year, he played with Leeds of the "International League" (a circuit populated largely by foreign import players) and with the Oldham Greyhounds of the Lancashire-Yorkshire League (the successor to Moores's original Yorkshire League). He pitched Oldham into the finals of the Challenge Cup, which would determine the national champions, but lost to Rochdale in a 15-inning pitching duel.

Kendrick also pitched two games in a series of "test matches" between the Great Britain and United States national teams which would become retroactively known as the inaugural Amateur World Series, the first major international baseball tournament. In the two games he started, he pitched two shutouts and struck out 16 and 12 American batters, respectively, to deliver Great Britain the championship.

During World War II, Kendrick played in games against American servicemen, including one against Skippy Roberge, a former Major Leaguer. After the war, he became an electrician. He was selected to the Great Britain roster that played two matches against the Netherlands at De Meer Stadion in Amsterdam (home of AFC Ajax) in 1952; the Netherlands won both games.

Kendrick continued playing baseball into his 60s. He was inducted into the British Baseball Hall of Fame as part of the inaugural class in 2009.
