= Dutch Maid Bakery =

Historic family bakery in Tracy City, Tennessee

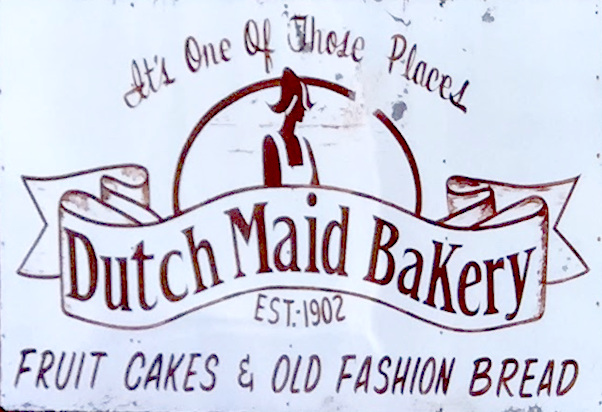
- Interactive map of Dutch Maid Bakery

Restaurant information
- Established: 1902
- Owner: Cindy Day
- Previous owner: Baggentoss family
- Food type: Dutch Bakery
- Location: 109 Main St, Tracy City, Tennessee, 37387, United States
- Coordinates: 35°15′41″N 85°44′12″W
- Website: www.dutchmaid.net

Dutch Maid Bakery is a bakery located in Tracy City, Tennessee, United States. Established in 1902 by Swiss immigrant John Baggentoss, the bakery is known for its traditional breads, fruitcakes, cookies, and pastries. The pastries are prepared using recipes and equipment passed down across generations.

In the early 2000s, baker Cindy Day acquired the business and set out to honor its history while gently modernizing it. She introduced artisan breads and refreshed some classics, while still using original Baggentoss-era equipment.

As of July 2022, it continues to operate in its original location. The bakery is recognized for its longevity and craftsmanship. It is a regional landmark, and is frequently featured in publications, and seasonal guides.

== History ==
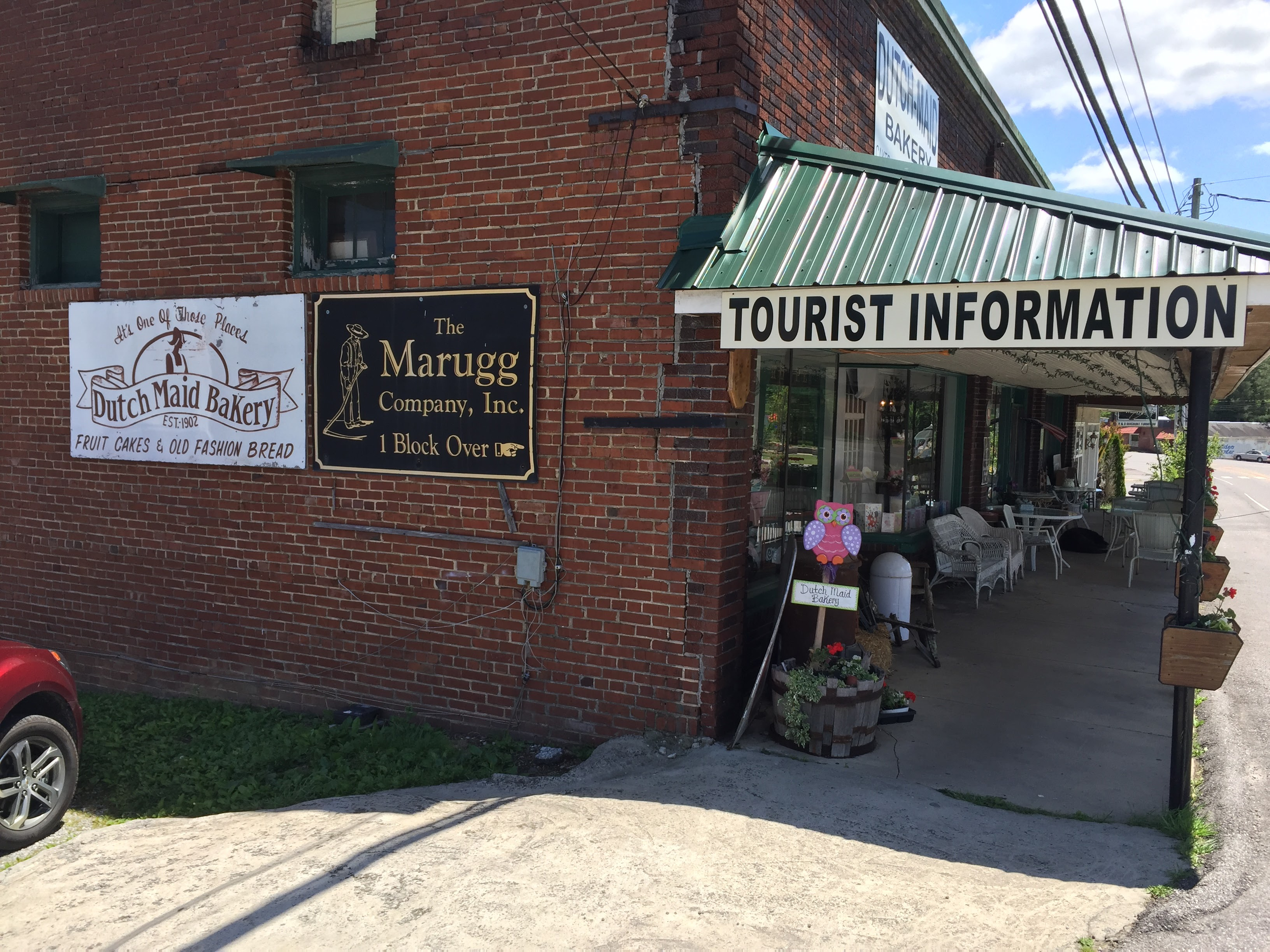
The exterior of Dutch Maid Bakery in Tracy City, Tennessee, with porch seating, heritage signage, and a tourist information post

Bagenstoss Grocery and Bakery was founded in 1902 by John Baggentoss, a Swiss immigrant who brought European baking traditions to the Cumberland Plateau. He opened the bakery in downtown Tracy City and passed his recipes, hand-written in a large notebook, to his sons.

Fire destroyed much of the original building in the early 1920s, but the Bagenstoss family salvaged some of the original structure, rebuilt with brick, and continued using equipment which remains in use to the present.

When the Baggentoss sons departed for war, the women took over. What had been called "Bagenstoss Grocery and Bakery" took on a different name to avoid the negative perceptions of a German name, though the family was Swiss-German. Such was the confusion about the origin of the family among locals that even the courthouse mistook "Deutsch" for "Dutch", so the name "Dutch Maid" came to be used.

After returning from service in World War II, all six of John's sons, John, Robert, Herman, Fred, Charlie, and Albert, ran the bakery together. Each took on a role within the shop, maintaining the original recipes and working with many of the same tools their father used.

The bakery remained in the Baggentoss family for much of the 20th century and became a regional institution, particularly known for its fruitcakes and rye breads. During the Great Depression, the family reportedly gave away bread to locals in need.

== Ownership and modern era ==
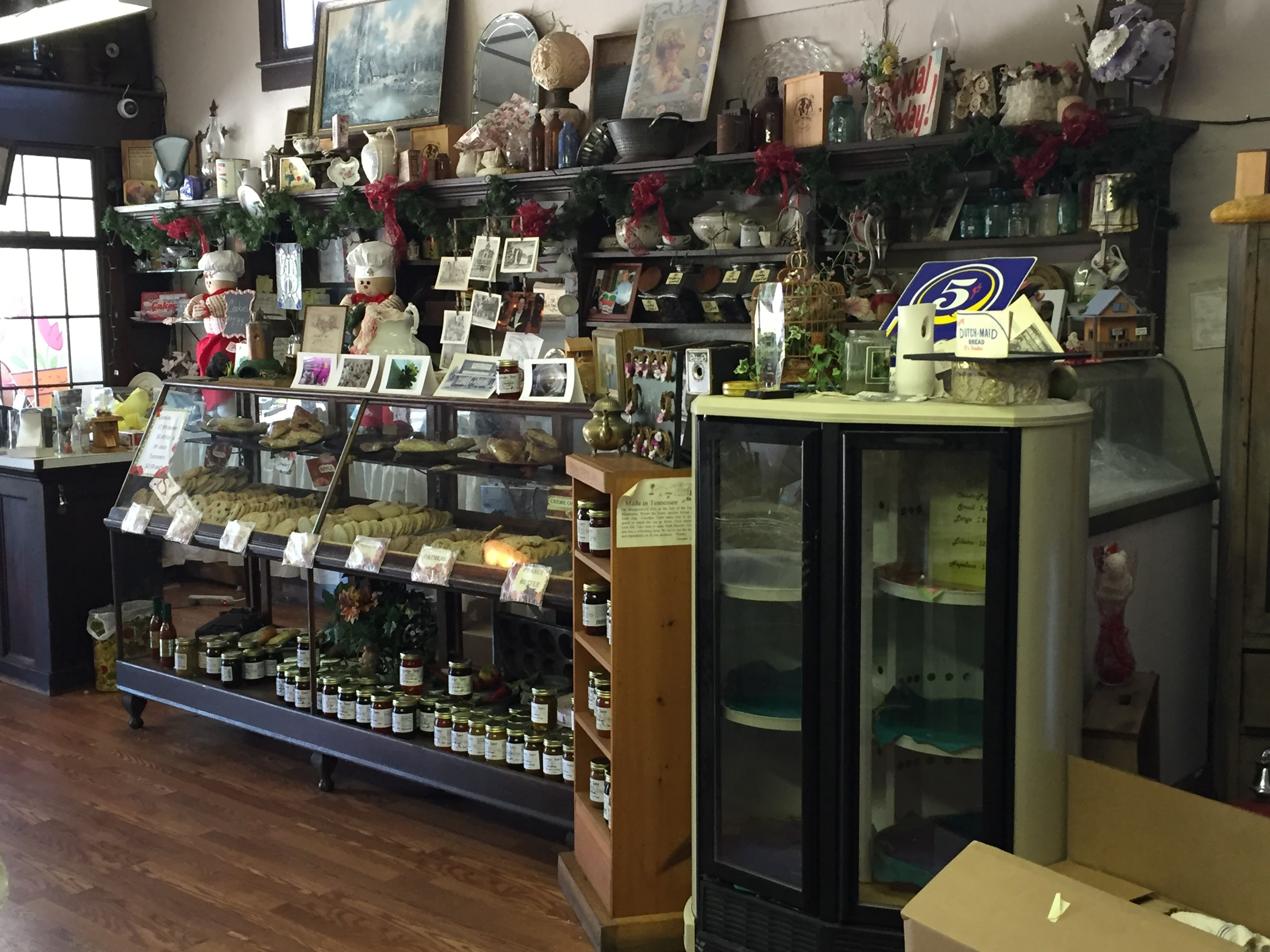
A display case at Dutch Maid Bakery holds rows of cookies, with shelves behind it offering jams, preserves, and vintage memorabilia.

In the early 2000s, ownership passed to Cindy Day, a baker with prior experience in the grocery sector. She purchased the business after learning of its availability, committing to preserve its legacy while introducing new offerings such as artisan breads and updated versions of traditional fruitcakes.

The modern product "Russian Christmas Cake" is a revised recipe of the bakery's longtime favorite fruitcake, renamed because, as Day says, "Many of the younger generation just cringe at the words fruit cake."

Day continues producing the bakery's signature products, many of which are still made with original Baggentoss family equipment such as wooden proofing cabinets and early 20th-century bread tins.

== Recognition ==
Dutch Maid has been profiled in multiple regional and statewide publications for its longevity, craftsmanship, and cultural heritage. Its continuous operation since 1902 has made it one of the longest-running bakeries of its kind in the southeastern United States. It is recognized as the oldest family-owned bakery in Tennessee.

The bakery has become a local and regional landmark, appearing in news features, holiday guides, and a 2025 film shoot.
