= Jacksonville Express =

American Football Team

General information
- Founded: January 1975
- Folded: October 1975
- Stadium: Gator Bowl Stadium
- Headquartered: Jacksonville, Florida
- Colours: Black, red and gold

Personnel
- Owners: Earl Knabb, Bill DeCarlis
- Head coach: Charlie Tate

League / conference affiliations
- World Football League; Eastern Division

The Jacksonville Express were a professional American football team based in Jacksonville, Florida which competed in the World Football League (WFL) in 1975. They were preceded in 1974 by the WFL's Jacksonville Sharks, though the two teams had separate ownership and identities. The Express folded when the league ceased operations during the 1975 season.

== History ==
The Jacksonville Sharks were a professional American football team based in Jacksonville, Florida which competed in the 1974 WFL season. The Sharks folded during that season due to financial difficulties. The WFL returned to Jacksonville the following season with the Jacksonville Express. While head coach Charlie Tate and a few players returned from the Sharks, the Express had new owners (local businessman Earl Knabb along with several minor partners) and a mostly new front office staff. The team's biggest player acquisitions were quarterback George Mira, who had been co-MVP of the 1974 WFL championship game with Birmingham and had been a college All-American with the in-state Miami Hurricanes, and Tommy Reamon, who had led the WFL in rushing in 1974 with the Florida Blazers. Paul Orndorff, later a famed professional wrestler, was briefly on the Express roster.

The new ownership group sought to be much more frugal than the free-spending Sharks had been. One notable example of this was that while the Sharks' headquarters had been located in a large suite atop a skyscraper in downtown Jacksonville, the offices of the Express were located in a mall in the basement of a hotel. Accordingly, the franchise was able to meet its financial obligations throughout its short existence. However, the WFL had lost their television contract right before the 1975 season, putting the entire league in serious financial difficulty. The Express had compiled a 6–5 record when the WFL folded in October 1975, 11 games into a planned 20-game schedule.

== Schedule and results ==
Key:	Win	Loss	Bye

=== 1975 regular season ===
Week	Day	Date	Opponent	Result	Venue	Attendance	Source
1	Sunday	August 2, 1975	at Memphis Grizzlies	L 26–27	Memphis Memorial Stadium	25,166	
2	Sunday	August 16, 1975	Birmingham Vulcans	W 22–11	Gator Bowl Stadium	16,049	
3	Sunday	August 23, 1975	San Antonio Wings	W 26–19	Gator Bowl Stadium	16,133	
4	Sunday	August 30, 1975	Charlotte Hornets	L 14–33	Gator Bowl Stadium	16,428	
5	Saturday	September 6, 1975	at Shreveport Steamer	W 22–15	State Fair Stadium	13,638	
6	Sunday	September 14, 1975	at Hawaiians	L 15–33	Aloha Stadium	18,479	
7	Saturday	September 20, 1975	Philadelphia Bell	W 16–10	Gator Bowl Stadium	10,296	
8	Saturday	September 27, 1975	Birmingham Vulcans	W 26–18	Gator Bowl Stadium	10,881	
9	Saturday	October 4, 1975	Portland Thunder	W 32–29	Gator Bowl Stadium	8,119	
10	Sunday	October 12, 1975	at Charlotte Hornets	L 15–22	American Legion Memorial Stadium	7,750	
11	Sunday	October 19, 1975	at Portland Thunder	L 13–30	Civic Stadium	8,713	

== See also ==
- Jacksonville Sharks (WFL)
- 1975 World Football League season
