= Bud Asher =

American politician, football coach, and lawyer

Mayor of Daytona Beach, Florida
- In office November 7, 1995 – 2003
- Preceded by: Paul Carpenella
- Succeeded by: Yvonne Scarlett-Golden

Personal details
- Born: May 27, 1925 Atlanta, Georgia, U.S.
- Died: July 5, 2013 (aged 88) Daytona Beach, Florida, U.S.
- Spouse: Dawn Ioviero Asher
- Education: University of Georgia

Baron Henry "Bud" Asher (May 27, 1925 – July 5, 2013) was an American politician, football coach and former lawyer. Asher served as the mayor of Daytona Beach, Florida, for eight years from 1995 until 2003. Before becoming mayor, Asher was elected as a Daytona Beach City Commissioner in 1983, a position he held for twelve years from 1983 to 1995.

== Biography ==
=== Early life ===
Asher was born in Atlanta, Georgia, on May 27, 1925, to Baron Hirsch Asher and Erna Fromme. He graduated from the new defunct Tech High in Atlanta. He enlisted with the U.S. Navy in 1943 during World War II, serving on board the USS Bunker Hill and USS Bennington, which were part of a larger torpedo squadron in the Pacific Theater. He saw action at campaigns and battles in the Philippines, Iwo Jima, Guam, Palau, Formosa (Taiwan) and Okinawa. Asher received two Air Medals, as well as theater ribbons and unit citations, for his service in the Navy during the war.

He initially attended the University of Tennessee after the war, but transferred to the University of Georgia, where he earned both his bachelor's degree and law degrees. (He later served as the secretary of the Georgia Bulldog Club, the university's Athletic Association fundraising arm).

== Career ==
Asher practiced law in Atlanta until 1954, when he moved to Florida to accept a position as the assistant football coach for Stetson University. He would later become a hotelier and business owner in Daytona Beach. Asher owned and operated a string of nightclubs, businesses and hotels in the city, including the Safari Beach Motel.

During the early 1960s, the city of Fort Lauderdale, located more than 200 miles south of Daytona Beach, became a popular spring break destination with American college students. However, due to the large number of students, relations between the thousands of college students and Fort Lauderdale became strained. Asher, along with other Daytona Beach business and political leaders, began a campaign to attract some of Fort Lauderdale's spring breakers to Daytona. in 1962, Asher and other area businessmen began driving to colleges, where they distributed postcards, brochures and other materials promoting Daytona Beach as a Spring Break destination. They also hired airplanes, which dropped ping-pong balls advertising Daytona Beach onto college campuses, a tradition which is still practiced by spring breakers in the city today. Each of the ping-pong balls were inscribed with "Get on the Ball and Come to Daytona Beach."

The campaign succeeded in transforming Daytona Beach into a major spring break destination. Asher did have detractors and critics, who accused him of promoting Daytona Beach as a "beer-can mentality" destination for college students, rather than promoting the city as a place for family friendly vacationers. However, Asher's efforts earned him the nickname, "Father of Spring Break," within Daytona Beach.

=== Political career ===
Asher served as a district judge in New Smyrna Beach, Florida, for two years.

In 1983, he was elected a city commissioner representing District 2, an office he held for the next twelve years, from 1983 to 1995.

Asher was first elected mayor of Daytona Beach in 1995. Asher's predecessor, incumbent Paul Carpenella, who served as mayor from 1993 to 1995, failed to gain enough votes in the primary to advance to the mayoral general election. Asher raised more than $60,000 for his first mayoral campaign. Asher defeated his 1995 general election challenger, former city Public Works Director Tom McClelland, by approximately 600 votes in the municipal election. He was sworn into office on November 7, 1995. He was re-elected in 1997, 1999, and 2001, before retiring from office in 2003.

== Football ==
Asher continued to work in football for more than sixty years, while simultaneously remaining in business and politics. He coached football for high schools in Volusia County, including New Smyrna Beach High School, Spruce Creek High School and Father Lopez Catholic High School, as well as the Daytona Beach Bulldogs for the midget league. He was also involved with Bethune-Cookman University for more than 40 years as the university's football coach, as well as a consultant adviser to several of BCU's presidents. He also coached the Jacksonville Sharks of the defunct World Football League and the Daytona Beach ThunderBirds, a semi-pro team.

He scouted potential players for both the NFL and college football programs for more than 30 years. He specifically worked as an NFL talent scout for the San Diego Chargers, Cincinnati Bengals and the Oakland Raiders.

He was inducted into the Florida Athletic Coaches Association Hall of Fame in 2000. He called games as a commentator and sports announcer on WNDB 1150 for the last two years of his life.

Bud Asher died from prostate cancer at his home on the Halifax River in Daytona Beach at 9 PM on July 5, 2013, at the age of 88. He was survived by his wife of 27 years, Dawn Ioviero Asher; his children from his previous marriage, Marybeth Asher-Lawson and Baron "Ron" Asher; his stepdaughter, Wendy Fiore Bentley; and five grandchildren. His funeral was held at Our Lady of Lourdes Catholic Church with burial at Daytona Memorial Park, complete with full military honors and an honorific flyover during the ceremony.
