= Gator Bowl Stadium =

American football stadium in Jacksonville, FL, US built 1927 demolished 1994

Gator Bowl
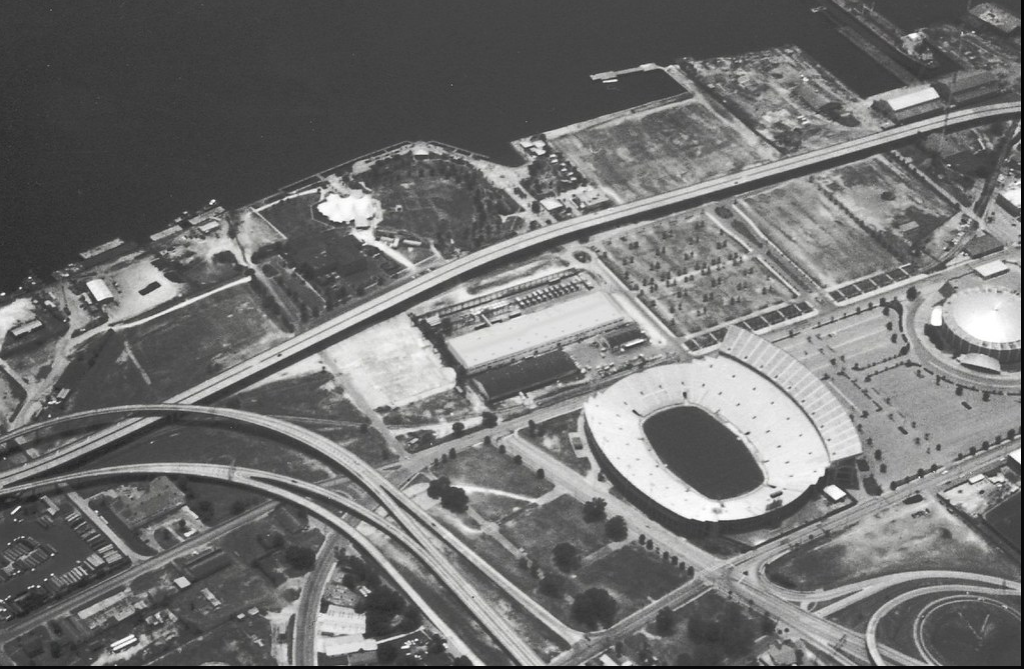
- The Gator Bowl in 1993
- Interactive map of Gator Bowl
- Former names: Fairfield Stadium (1927–1948)
- Coordinates: 30°19′26″N 81°38′15″W
- Owner: City of Jacksonville
- Operator: City of Jacksonville
- Capacity: 7,600 (1927–1947); 16,000 (1948); 36,058 (1949–1956); 62,000 (1957–1973); 72,000 (1974–1983); 80,126 (1984–1994)
- Surface: Natural grass

Construction
- Groundbreaking: 1927
- Opened: 1928
- Closed: 1994
- Demolished: 1994

Tenants
- Florida–Georgia football game (1933–1993); Gator Bowl (NCAA) (1946–1993); Senior Bowl (NCAA) (1950); Jacksonville Sharks (WFL) (1974); Jacksonville Express (WFL) (1975); Jacksonville Tea Men (NASL/ASL/USL) (1981–1984); Jacksonville Bulls (USFL) (1984–1985)

The Gator Bowl was an American football stadium located in Jacksonville, Florida. Originally built in 1927, all but a small portion of the facility was razed in 1994 in preparation for the inaugural season of the Jacksonville Jaguars, an NFL expansion team that began play in 1995. The reconstructed stadium became Jacksonville Municipal Stadium, now known as EverBank Stadium. The old stadium and its replacement have hosted the Gator Bowl, a post-season college football bowl game, since its inception in 1946. It also hosted the Florida–Georgia game, an annual college football rivalry game between the University of Florida and the University of Georgia, and was home to several professional sports teams, including the Jacksonville Sharks and Jacksonville Express of the World Football League (WFL), the Jacksonville Tea Men soccer team, and the Jacksonville Bulls of the United States Football League.

== Origins ==
Jacksonville's first football venue was built in 1927 and 1928 with a seating capacity of 7,600. Known as Fairfield Stadium, its primary purpose was to serve as home field for Jacksonville's three new high schools – Lee, Jackson and Landon. At the opening of the stadium, Florida Governor John W. Martin called the stadium "the best place in Florida to watch a football game!"

On January 1, 1946, the stadium received national attention when it hosted the first Gator Bowl game. The stadium was expanded to 16,000 seats in 1948, and the structure was renamed the Gator Bowl. Prior to the 1949 game, the seating capacity was expanded to 36,058, at which it remained until 1957.

== College and professional sports tenants ==
The stadium was home to the World Football League's Jacksonville Sharks in 1974 and the Jacksonville Express in 1975. It was the home of a North American Soccer League team, the Jacksonville Tea Men from 1981 to 1984 and then a United States Football League team, the Jacksonville Bulls from 1984 to 1985.

The stadium was the site of the Gator Bowl from 1949 to 1993. It also hosted the annual Florida–Georgia game between the University of Georgia and the University of Florida college football teams from 1933 to 1993. The 1950 Senior Bowl, the first game in that bowl's history, was also played at the stadium.

The Gator Bowl hosted the 1968 and 1969 AFL All-Star Games.

Concert tickets for the Beatles in Jacksonville

== The Beatles at the Gator Bowl ==
The Beatles played a concert at the Gator Bowl on their first American Tour on September 11, 1964. When the Beatles found out that the concert was going to be racially segregated and the Black audience degraded, they refused to play there unless they allowed the audience to be desegregated, as Black people had the freedom to sit where they liked in Europe.

Paul McCartney went on record about their disapproval of the situation, and their lack of understanding of segregation in the first place, while John Lennon said, "We never play to segregated audiences and we aren't going to start now. I'd sooner lose our appearance money." After city officials relented, the band played to an integrated audience.

The concert was held the day after Hurricane Dora struck St. Augustine and Jacksonville; most of Jacksonville was without electricity and power was not restored for several days. Despite the hurricane, 23,000 fans attended, paying $4 and $5 for tickets. During the concert, Ringo Starr's drumkit was nailed to the stage because of the 45 mph winds.

== Near-total demolition ==
The historic structure was almost entirely razed in 1994, as part of a massive remodeling effort which essentially built a new stadium. The new stadium was renamed Jacksonville Municipal Stadium (currently named EverBank Stadium). Almost none of the original infrastructure remains, except for the west upper deck (which had been added in 1982) and the ramping system. While Jacksonville Municipal Stadium was being constructed, the Florida–Georgia game alternated between the two schools' home stadiums, with Florida's Ben Hill Griffin Stadium in Gainesville hosting in 1994 and Georgia's Sanford Stadium hosting in 1995. The 1994 Gator Bowl was also held in Gainesville. Both games returned to Jacksonville the following season.

== Gallery ==
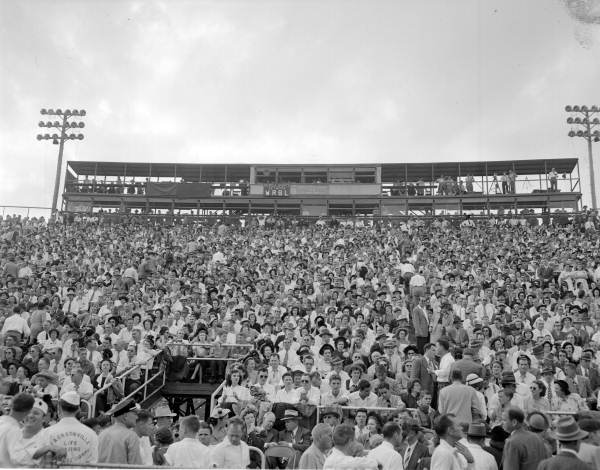
View of the audience at the 1948 Gator Bowl

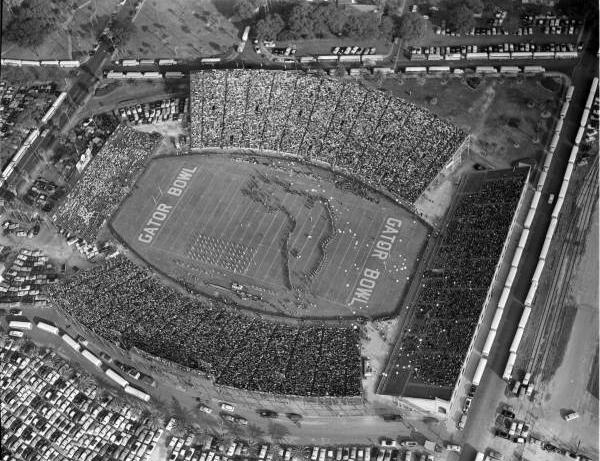
Aerial view of the 1954 Gator Bowl

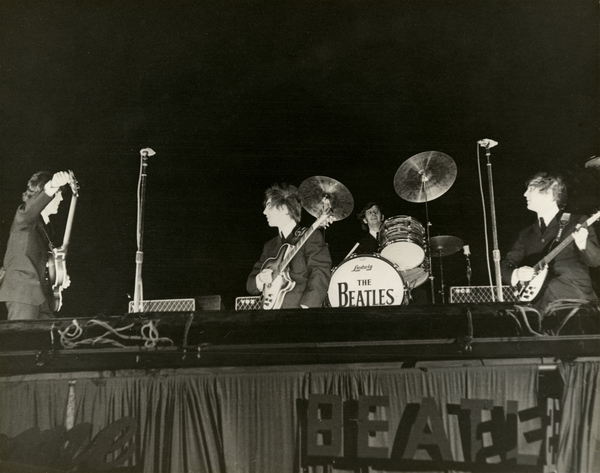
The Beatles performing at the Gator Bowl with Ringo Starr’s drumkit nailed to the stage in 1964.

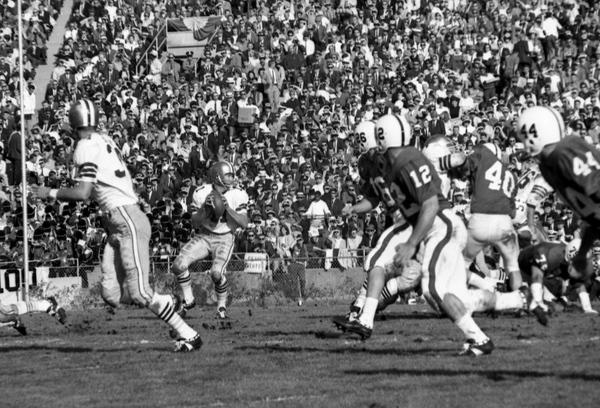
1965 Gator Bowl
