= Gil Steer =

Canadian football player (1928–2007)

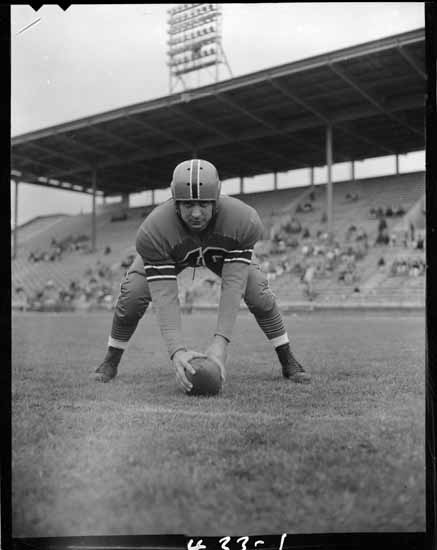
- Steer in 1954

No. 40
- Position: Centre

Personal information
- Born: June 20, 1928; Regina, Saskatchewan, Canada
- Died: November 30, 2007 (aged 79); North Vancouver, British Columbia, Canada
- Listed height: 6 ft 2 in (1.88 m)
- Listed weight: 206 lb (93 kg)

Career history
- 1951–1952: Calgary Stampeders
- 1954–1955: BC Lions

Gilbert William Steer (June 20, 1928 – November 30, 2007) was a Canadian professional football player who played for the BC Lions and Calgary Stampeders. He also played football at the University of British Columbia.
