= Doug Reid (Canadian football) =

Canadian football player (1924–2007)

No. 89
- Positions: Halfback, Fullback

Personal information
- Born: September 3, 1924; Vancouver, British Columbia, Canada
- Died: March 17, 2007 (aged 82); British Columbia, Canada
- Listed height: 5 ft 10 in (1.78 m)
- Listed weight: 190 lb (86 kg)

Career information
- University: UBC

Career history
- 1950–1951: Calgary Stampeders
- 1954–1955: BC Lions

Douglas Charles Thomas Reid (September 3, 1924 – March 17, 2007) was a Canadian professional football player who played for the Calgary Stampeders and BC Lions. He played college football at the University of British Columbia. He is a member of the UBC Sports Hall of Fame. He died in 2007.
