= Pete Thodos =

Profile
- Position: Halfback

Personal information
- Born: November 11, 1927; Vancouver, British Columbia, Canada
- Died: December 25, 2011 (aged 84); Vancouver, British Columbia, Canada
- Listed height: 5 ft 9 in (1.75 m)
- Listed weight: 178 lb (81 kg)

Career history
- 1948–1949: Calgary Stampeders
- 1950–1951: Montreal Alouettes
- 1952–1953: Calgary Stampeders
- 1954: BC Lions
- 1954: Winnipeg Blue Bombers
- 1955–1956: Saskatchewan Roughriders

Awards and highlights
- Grey Cup champion (1948)

Peter Nickolas Thodos (November 11, 1927 – December 25, 2011) was a Canadian professional football player who played for the Calgary Stampeders, Montreal Alouettes, BC Lions, Winnipeg Blue Bombers and Saskatchewan Roughriders. He won the Grey Cup with the Stampeders in 1948. Thodos was born and raised in Vancouver, British Columbia where he also played junior football. He is best known for having scored the winning touchdown of the Grey Cup game, completing the 12–7 victory over the Ottawa Rough Riders for the championship. Thodos died of heart disease in 2011; at the time of his death he was one of the last living members of the 1948 Stampeders Grey Cup team.
