= Baseball at the 1936 Summer Olympics =

Baseball at the 1936 Summer Olympics Demonstration sport
- Games played: 1
- Date: August 12, 1936
- Venue: Olympic Stadium
- City: Berlin, Germany
- Baseball at the Summer Olympics
- «1912 1952»

Baseball was again a demonstration sport at the 1936 Summer Olympics after a 24-year absence. It would become an official sport 56 years later at the 1992 Summer Olympics. Both of the teams that played in Berlin were from the United States.

The exhibition game was played on 12 August 1936 in front of 90,000 spectators in Berlin's Olympic Stadium. The two teams were named the "World Champions" and the "U. S. Olympics". The World Champions won, 6–5.

Leslie Mann, who had pushed strongly for inclusion of baseball as an Olympic sport, was the umpire.

== Game result ==
| Team | 1 | 2 | 3 | 4 | 5 | 6 | 7 | R | H | E |
|---|---|---|---|---|---|---|---|---|---|---|
| U. S. Olympics | 2 | 0 | 0 | 1 | 1 | 0 | 1 | 5 | 11 | 6 |
| World Champions | 1 | 0 | 0 | 1 | 0 | 3 | 1 | 6 | 9 | 0 |

Shaw hit a two-run home run in the first inning. At the end of six innings, the World Champions led, 5–4. The Olympics scored in the seventh to tie the game before McNeece hit a solo walk-off home run in the bottom of the seventh to end the game. Sayles was the starting pitcher for the World Champions, relieved by Thompson after giving up four runs in the first two innings.

== Rosters ==
=== World Champions ===
- Dow Wilson, SS
- Ernest Eddowes, 3B
- Les McNeece, 2B
- Ron Hibbard, CF
- Paul Amen, 1B
- Norman Livermore, C
- Tom Downey, RF
- Herman Goldberg, LF
- Bill Sayles, P
- Carson Thompson, P
- Curtis Myers, P

=== U. S. Olympics ===
- Grover Galvin Jr., CF
- Rolf N "Swede" Carlsten, SS
- Bill Shaw, 1B
- Gordon Mallatratt, 2B
- Emmett Fore, LF
- Clarence K. Keegan, 3B
- Dick Hanna, RF
- Henry Stark Wagnon, C
- Fred Heringer, P
- Charlie Simons, P

== Sources ==
- Cava, Pete (Summer 1992). "Baseball in the Olympics". Citius, Altius, Fortius. 1 (1): 7–15.
- Horvitz, Peter S. (2001). The Big Book of Jewish Baseball: An Illustrated Encyclopedia & Anecdotal History. S.P.I. Books. p. 222. ISBN 978-1561719730.
- Official Report. The XIth Olympic Games Berlin, 1936 volume 2, p. 1098-1100. 1936.
