= Leslie Mann (athlete) =

American baseball player (1892–1962)

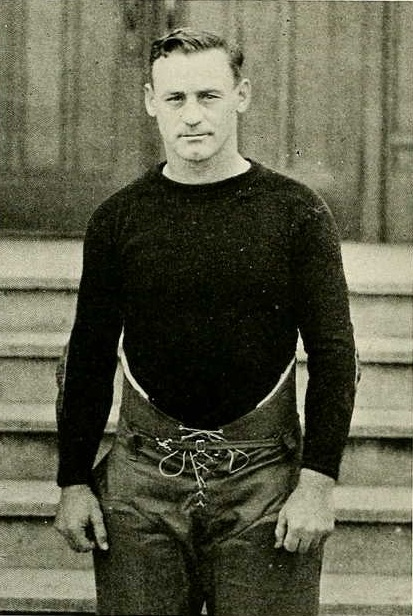
- Mann from The Arbutus, 1923

President of the IBF
- In office August 18, 1938 – October 6, 1940
- Preceded by: Office established
- Succeeded by: Jaime Mariné

Personal details
- Born: November 18, 1892 Lincoln, Nebraska, U.S.
- Died: January 14, 1962 (aged 69) Pasadena, California, U.S.
- Education: International YMCA College
- Baseball career
- Outfielder
- Batted: Right Threw: Right

MLB debut
- April 30, 1913, for the Boston Braves

Last MLB appearance
- September 30, 1928, for the New York Giants

MLB statistics
- Batting average: .282
- Hits: 1,332
- Runs batted in: 503
- Stats at Baseball Reference

Teams
- Boston Braves (1913–1914); Chicago Whales (1915); Chicago Cubs (1916–1919); Boston Braves (1919–1920); St. Louis Cardinals (1921–1923); Cincinnati Reds (1923); Boston Braves (1924–1927); New York Giants (1927–1928)

Career highlights and awards
- World Series champion (1914); Federal League pennant winner (1915)
- Coaching career

Coaching career (HC unless noted)

Basketball
- 1915–1918: Amherst
- 1919–1920: Rice
- 1922–1924: Indiana
- 1924–1926: Springfield (MA)

Head coaching record
- Overall: 43–30

Leslie Mann (November 18, 1892 – January 14, 1962) was an American athlete and sports administrator. He played college football and professional baseball, and went on to coach football, baseball, and basketball. He was the founder and first president of the International Baseball Federation, the predecessor to the modern World Baseball Softball Confederation (WBSC).

Mann played in Major League Baseball (MLB) as an outfielder from 1913 to 1928 for seven teams, spending eight years of his career with the Boston Braves. After his playing career, Mann became a tireless promoter of international amateur baseball, founding the U.S. Amateur Baseball Federation in 1931 and the International Baseball Federation in 1938. He helped bring baseball to the 1936 Berlin Olympics and coached the United States national team at the inaugural 1938 Amateur World Series. His efforts to further internationalize the game were derailed by World War II.

Mann was the head basketball coach at Rice Institute (1919–1920), Indiana University (1922–1924), and Springfield College (1924–1926). He compiled a career record of 43–30 in five seasons as a head basketball coach.

== Early years ==
Born in Lincoln, Nebraska, Mann attended the Y.M.C.A. College in Springfield, Massachusetts. He played both football and basketball at Springfield and was regarded as "one of the best football players the training school ever had."

== Playing career ==
Mann later became a professional baseball player. From 1913 to 1928, he played for the Boston Braves, St. Louis Cardinals, Cincinnati Reds, New York Giants, and Chicago Cubs.

He was a member of the 1914 "Miracle" Braves team that went from last place to first place in two months, becoming the first team to win a pennant after being in last place on the Fourth of July. The team then went on to defeat Connie Mack's heavily favored Philadelphia Athletics in the 1914 World Series.

Mann jumped to the rival Federal League in 1915, signing with the Chicago Whales. The short lived league was in its final season, but Mann recorded his best season as a professional, batting .306 and leading the league with 19 triples as the Whales won the pennant.

With the demise of the Federal League, Mann returned to Major League Baseball as a member of the Chicago Cubs in 1916. As a member of the pennant winning Cubs in 1918, Mann also recorded an RBI single off Babe Ruth in Game 4 of the 1918 World Series. Ruth's Boston Red Sox defeated the Cubs 4-2 to win the Series, their last World Series title until 2004.

Mann served mostly as a platoon player from 1919 onward. Although he'd bat over .300 in several season over the final part of his career, Mann did do so falling well short of the necessary plate appearances to qualify for a batting title.

Mann had a reputation as a "clean" player, who disapproved of vices like drinking and gambling in the clubhouse. While he was with the Cardinals in 1922, he received a letter from Giants pitcher Phil Douglas. Douglas, at odds with Giants manager John McGraw, suggested that he would be willing to jump ship, effectively tipping the pennant race to the Cardinals. Mann advised manager Branch Rickey, who passed the letter to Baseball Commissioner Kenesaw Mountain Landis, who banned Douglas from baseball for life.

== Coaching career ==
Mann also worked for many years as a college football and basketball coach. From 1914 to 1916, he was a basketball coach at Amherst College.

In 1919, he became a coach at Rice Institute in Houston. In February 1922, Mann was hired as an assistant football coach at Indiana. He also coached the Indiana Hoosiers men's basketball team during the 1922–23 and 1923–24 seasons.

Starting in 1924, Mann was hired as the head basketball coach and assistant football coach at his alma mater, which by then had become Springfield College.

== International baseball ==
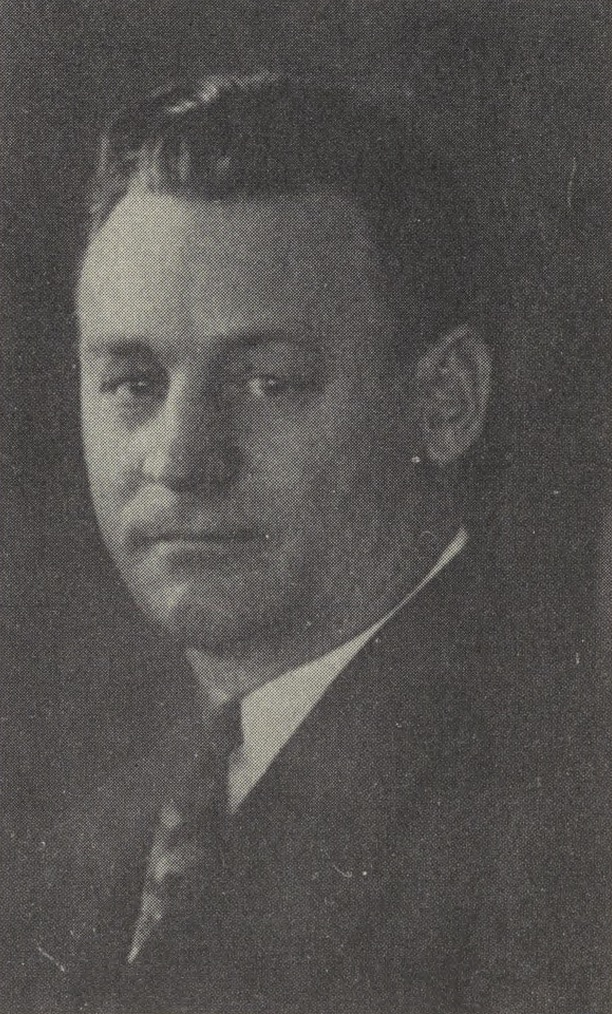
Leslie Mann in 1940

After retiring as a player and coach, Mann became an advocate for baseball as an international sport, founding the U.S.A. Baseball Congress. He organized a 12-game tour of Japan in 1935, with an American amateur team taking eight games and dropping four against Japanese opponents.

Mann went on to found the International Baseball Federation (IBF) in 1938. Its inaugural tournament was held in England, billed as the Amateur World Series. The English team, composed mainly of Canadian college players, won 4 out of 5 games against the American team. The IBF also organized subsequent championships in Cuba in 1939 and Puerto Rico in 1941.

Mann fought to include baseball at the Summer Olympics. He petitioned the US Olympic Committee to include baseball as a demonstration sport at the 1932 Los Angeles Games, but the committee chose football and lacrosse instead. Baseball's inclusion in the Olympics was opposed by powerful figures like Avery Brundage, head of the USOC (and future president of the International Olympic Committee), who was "a firm believer in the idea that there was no such thing as an amateur baseball player." Nevertheless, Mann's efforts to promote the sport got baseball was selected as a demonstration sport in the 1936 Summer Olympics played in Berlin. Originally, the United States team was scheduled to play a Japanese team, but the Japanese withdrew. The American team was separated into two squads who competed against each other in a single game. The "World Champions" lineup beat the "U. S. Olympics" lineup by a score of 6–5 before a crowd of 100,000 people on August 12, 1936.

World War II brought Mann's efforts to an end. His plans for the 1940 Olympic Games in Tokyo – where baseball had already been approved as a demonstration sport – were scuttled after Japan forfeited the games. Mann also had hopes to establish Olympic baseball at the 1944 Games in London, but those too were canceled due to the outbreak of war.

Mann also arranged a 33-game tour of South Africa and Rhodesia between November 1955 and February 1956.

== Later years ==
He died in Pasadena, California on January 14, 1962, aged 69.

== Head coaching records ==
Record table
Season	Team	Overall	Conference	Standing	Postseason
Rice Owls (Southwest Conference) (1919–1920)
1919–20	Rice	6–6	2–5	4th	
Rice:		6–6 (.500)	2–5 (.286)		
Indiana Hoosiers (Big Ten Conference) (1923–1924)
1922–23	Indiana	8–7	5–7	7th	
1923–24	Indiana	11–6	7–5	T–6th	
Indiana:		19–13 (.594)	12–12 (.500)		
Total:		43–30 (.589)			
National champion Postseason invitational champion Conference regular season champion Conference regular season and conference tournament champion Division regular season champion Division regular season and conference tournament champion Conference tournament champion

== Hitting and fielding stats ==
- 1,498 Games
- 4,716 At-bats
- 1,332 Hits
- 677 Runs
- 203 Doubles
- 106 Triples
- 44 Home runs
- 503 RBIs
- 129 Stolen bases
- 324 Bases on balls
- .282 Batting average
- .332 On-base percentage
- .398 Slugging percentage
- .966 Fielding percentage

== See also ==
- List of Major League Baseball career triples leaders
- List of Major League Baseball annual triples leaders
