= Sports in Erie, Pennsylvania =

Numerous minor league sports teams are based in Erie, Pennsylvania, alongside a range of college and high school programs. The region hosts Pennsylvania Interscholastic Athletic Association (PIAA) District 10 competition, noted for parity and close results. Erie has also supported multiple semi-professional and professional clubs over time. The city stages the nationally recognized Burger King Classic—formerly the McDonald’s Classic—an annual invitational that draws elite high school basketball teams from across the country.

== Professional teams in Erie ==
Club	League	Sport	Venue	Capacity	Founded	Championships
Erie SeaWolves	EL	Baseball	UPMC Park	6,000	1989	2 (2023, 2024)
Erie Otters	OHL	Ice hockey	Erie Insurance Arena	6,833	1996	2 (2002, 2017)
Lake Erie Jackals	BSL	Basketball	Joann Mullen Gymnasium	1,800	2016	

== Baseball ==
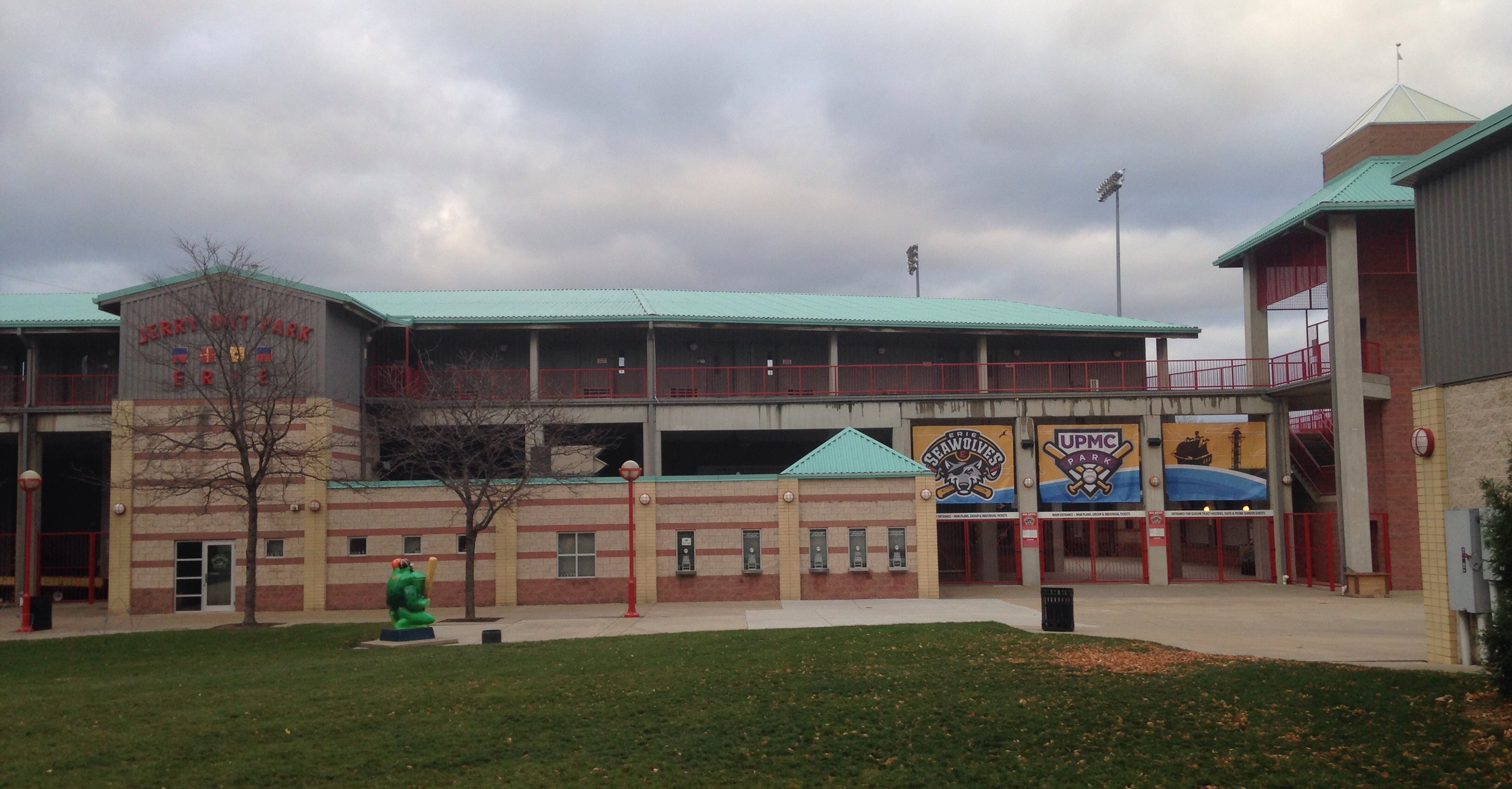
UPMC Park, home of the Erie SeaWolves

The Erie SeaWolves compete in the Eastern League as the Double-A affiliate of the Detroit Tigers, playing home games at UPMC Park in downtown Erie. The club won consecutive league championships in 2023 and 2024 and secured both halves of the 2025 regular season while pursuing a third title. In 2025, the team briefly appeared as the “Erie Moon Mammoths” during a promotional collaboration with HBO’s Last Week Tonight with John Oliver.

Earlier Erie clubs included the Erie Cardinals, Erie Orioles, and Erie Sailors. The city is also linked to the origin of the Pittsburgh Pirates nickname: following the 1891 signing of Erie native Lou Bierbauer, rivals described Pittsburgh’s actions as “piratical,” a term the club soon adopted.

== Hockey ==
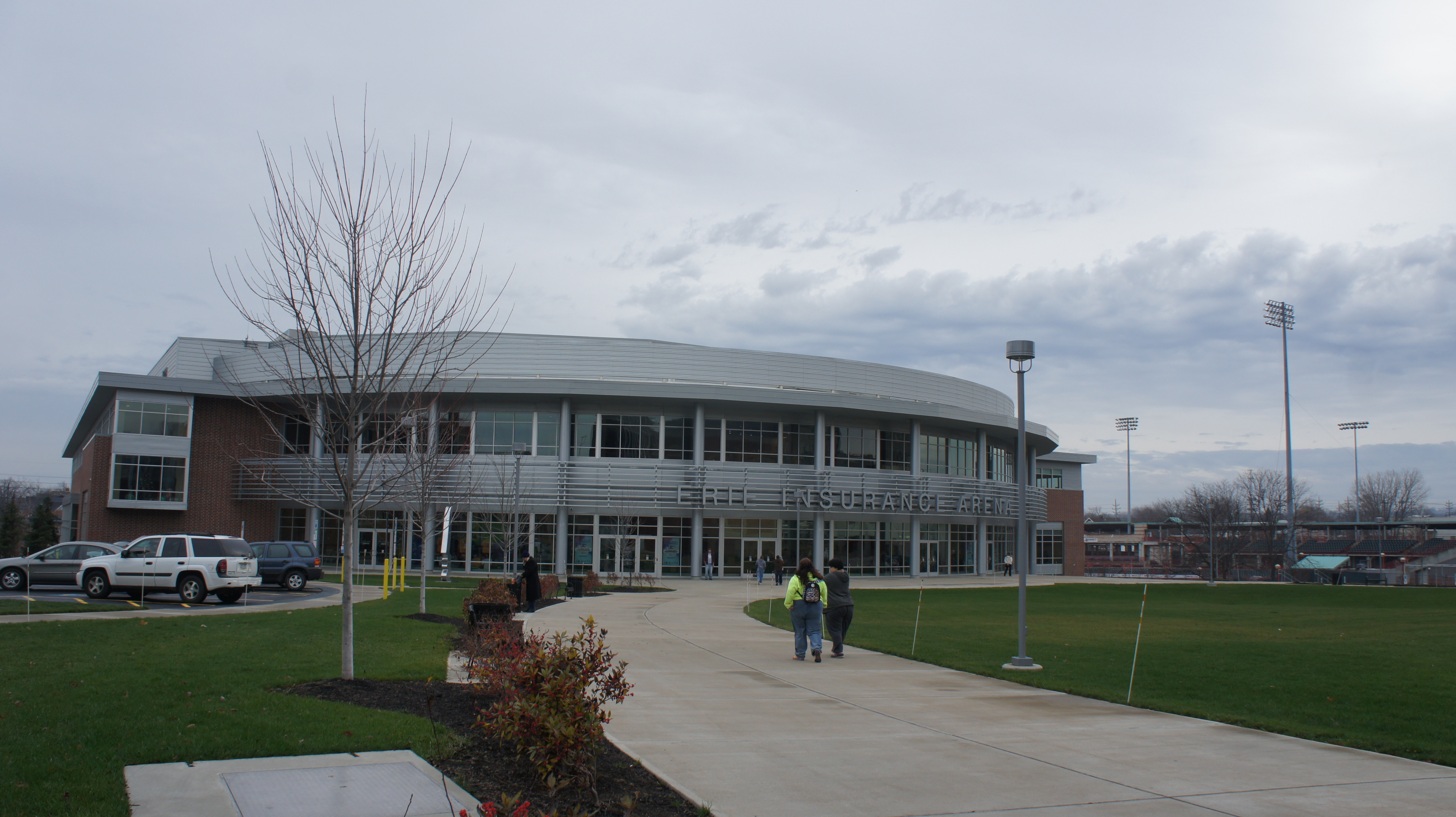
Erie Insurance Arena

The Erie Otters play in the Ontario Hockey League and are recognized for developing future National Hockey League players. Notable alumni include Connor McDavid, who competed for Erie from 2012 to 2015 before being selected first overall by the Edmonton Oilers. Ahead of 2025–26, local coverage noted roster changes and OHL rule updates with continued emphasis on player development and community engagement.

Earlier professional teams included the Erie Blades (AHL, 1975–1982) and Erie Panthers (ECHL, 1988–1996).

== Basketball ==
Erie’s basketball history spans professional, semi-professional, and scholastic levels. The Erie BayHawks competed in the NBA G League from 2008 to 2021 at Erie Insurance Arena, serving at various times as affiliates of the Cleveland Cavaliers, New York Knicks, and Atlanta Hawks before relocating—to Lakeland, Florida as the Lakeland Magic and later to College Park, Georgia as the College Park Skyhawks.

Other franchises included the Erie Wave (World Basketball League, 1990–1992), which played at the Louis J. Tullio Center before the league folded, and the Erie Hurricane (Premier Basketball League, 2013–2015), which competed at East High School.

The Lake Erie Jackals joined the Basketball Super League in 2016 and play at the Hagerty Family Events Center’s Joann Mullen Gymnasium (approx. 1,800). The team fields domestic and international players and operates youth and community programs.

=== Amateur teams in Erie ===
Club	League	Sport	Venue	Capacity	Founded	Championships
Erie Express	PAFL	Football	Dollinger Field	2,000	2012	3 (2010, 2021, 2022)
Erie Sports Center FC	USL	Soccer	Behrend Soccer Complex	1,000	2025	
Erie Commodores FC	NPSL	Soccer	Saxon Stadium	2,300	2009	
Erie FC	WPSL	Women's soccer	Gus Anderson Field	4,274	2022	

== Football ==
Erie maintains a strong presence in amateur and semi-professional football, anchored by the Erie Express. Founded in 2011, the Express compete in the Premier Amateur Football League (PAFL), one of the most competitive semi-professional circuits in the eastern United States. The team plays its home games at Dollinger Field, located within the Hagerty Family Events Center, which seats approximately 2,000 spectators.

The Express captured a national title in 2021 as members of the Gridiron Developmental Football League (GDFL) before joining the PAFL, where they continue to be perennial contenders. Under head coach Charles Portman, the team advanced to the 2024 PAFL Championship Game with an 11–1 record and one of the league’s top-ranked offenses. Ahead of the 2025 campaign, several veteran players and All-Pros returned to the roster as the Express pursued another deep postseason run.

== Soccer ==
Soccer has expanded steadily in Erie, supported by both men’s and women’s clubs and a strong youth development infrastructure.

The men’s club Erie Commodores FC—founded in 2009 as Erie Admirals SC and rebranded in 2015—competes in the NPSL and plays its home matches at Saxon Stadium on the campus of Mercyhurst University. The club has collected several conference titles (six to date), three regional championships, and three national semifinal appearances (including a national final appearance in 2009).

In 2025 the region added another men’s side: Erie Sports Center FC, which has been awarded licenses to field teams in both USL League Two and the USL W League (for women) and will play home matches at the state-of-the-art Erie Sports Center complex.

On the women’s front, Erie FC, established in 2022, competes in the Women's Premier Soccer League (WPSL). The club hosts home matches at Gus Anderson Field on the campus of McDowell High School. Evincing a commitment to youth development, Erie FC also runs club teams from U5 through U19 and a “Gunners” program for younger age groups.

== College and amateur sports ==
Erie is a hub for collegiate and amateur athletics and regularly hosts tournaments and postseason events.

- Mercyhurst University—NCAA Division I as of 2024 following reclassification from Division II; member of the Northeast Conference (NEC) for most sports and Atlantic Hockey for men’s ice hockey.
- Gannon University—NCAA Division II member of the PSAC, with notable programs in wrestling, basketball, acrobatics and tumbling, and football.
- Penn State Behrend—NCAA Division III member of the Allegheny Mountain Collegiate Conference (AMCC); frequent host of conference championships.
- PennWest Edinboro—About 20 miles south of Erie; NCAA Division II in the PSAC. The wrestling program has produced Olympians including Bruce Baumgartner and Nate Carr.

== Stock car racing ==
Erie County has two principal venues:

- Lake Erie Speedway—3/8-mile asphalt oval in North East, opened in 2002. Formerly sanctioned in the NASCAR Whelen All-American Series (2002–2013), the track now operates independently and hosts ARCA, ASA, and regional events; capacity approx. 10,000.
- Eriez Speedway—3/8-mile dirt oval in Greene Township with longstanding weekly programs and touring series dates, including the World of Outlaws Late Model Series.

== High school and youth sports ==
High school athletics in Erie are anchored by strong competition within the Pennsylvania Interscholastic Athletic Association (PIAA) District 10, which includes public and private schools in Erie and neighboring counties. Member schools compete across sports seasons and classifications, contributing to a culture of high-level participation and frequent postseason appearances.

Several schools stand out for consistent performance and community engagement. For example, McDowell High School, Cathedral Preparatory School and Mercyhurst Preparatory School routinely field teams that contend for district and state-level honors. These programs build strong feeder systems, emphasize student-athlete development, and maintain active support from alumni networks and local businesses.

One of the region’s signature events is the Burger King Classic, an elite four-team boys’ high school basketball invitational held annually in Erie and hosted by Cathedral Prep. The 41st edition of the tournament was held January 10–11, 2025, at the Joann Mullen Gymnasium and featured nationally ranked teams among its competitors. The Classic draws college recruiters and national media attention.

== Professional athletes from Erie ==
- Sig Andrusking, American football player
- Richard Arrington, All-American football player and wrestler at Notre Dame
- Art Baker, professional football player, Buffalo Bills
- Bruce Baumgartner, Olympic wrestler, National Wrestling Hall of Fame
- Lou Bierbauer, 19th-century Major League Baseball player
- Fred Biletnikoff, professional football player, Oakland Raiders, Super Bowl MVP, Pro Football Hall of Fame
- Jimmy Carr, youngest-ever American Olympic wrestler, National Wrestling Hall of Fame
- Nate Carr, Olympic wrestler (bronze medalist), three-time NCAA champion, Iowa State University
- James Conner, professional football player, Arizona Cardinals
- Clifton Crosby, professional football player, Indianapolis Colts
- Tim Federowicz, professional baseball player, Los Angeles Dodgers
- George Flint, professional football player, Buffalo Bills
- Eric Hicks, professional football player, Kansas City Chiefs
- Ed Hinkel, professional football player, Indianapolis Colts and Baltimore Ravens
- Sam Jethroe, Negro league and Major League player
- Jovon Johnson, professional football player, Ottawa Redblacks, CFL's Most Outstanding Defensive Player Award
- Caryn Kadavy, figure skater, 1987 World Bronze Medalist, 1988 Olympian
- Tom Lawless, professional baseball player, St. Louis Cardinals, Toronto Blue Jays, Montreal Expos
- Bob Learn, Jr., professional bowler, 1999 U.S. Open champion
- Frank Liebel, professional football defensive back, New York Giants, Chicago Bears
- Kayla McBride, professional basketball player, Las Vegas Aces, All-American, Notre Dame
- Mike McCoy, professional football player, Green Bay Packers, unanimous first-team All-American
- Bob Sanders, professional football player, Indianapolis Colts
- Brian Stablein, professional football player, Indianapolis Colts, Detroit Lions
- Mark Stepnoski, professional football player, Dallas Cowboys, Houston/Tennessee Oilers
