= Philip Arthur Fisher =

American stock investor

Phil Fisher
- Born: September 8, 1907
- Died: March 11, 2004 (aged 96)
- Occupation: Stock investor
- Children: Kenneth Fisher

Philip Arthur Fisher (September 8, 1907 – March 11, 2004 in San Francisco, California) was a proponent of the growth investing strategy. Fisher was born in San Francisco, the oldest child of Arthur Fisher and Eugenia Fisher (nee Samuels).

== Career ==
Philip Fisher's career began in 1928 when he dropped out of the newly created Stanford Graduate School of Business (later he would return to be one of only three people ever to teach the investment course) to work as a securities analyst with the Anglo-London Bank in San Francisco. He switched to a stock exchange firm for a short time before starting his own money management company, Fisher & Co., founded in 1931. He managed the company's affairs until his retirement in 1999 at the age of 91, and is reported to have made his clients extraordinary investment gains.

Although he began some fifty years before the name Silicon Valley became known, he specialized in innovative companies driven by research and development. He practiced long-term investing, and strove to buy great companies at reasonable prices. He was a very private person, giving few interviews, and was very selective about the clients he took on. He was not well known to the public until he published his first book in 1958. At this point Fisher's popularity rose dramatically and propelled him to his now legendary status as a pioneer in the field of growth investing. Morningstar has called him "one of the great investors of all time". In Common Stocks and Uncommon Profits, Fisher said that the best time to sell a stock was "almost never". His most famous investment was his purchase of Motorola, a company he bought in 1955 when it was a radio manufacturer, and held it until his death. Fisher is remembered for using and proliferating the "scuttlebutt" or "grape vine" tool, in which he searched fastidiously for information about a company. When you scuttlebutt, you make more informed decisions due to a better basis for analysis and valuation.

In the 2018 Berkshire Hathaway annual shareholders meeting, Warren Buffett called Fisher's Common Stocks and Uncommon Profits a "very, very good book". He further described how using Fisher's "scuttlebutt" technique continues to be a good way of investing, which is still used by Ted Weschler and Todd Combs at Berkshire Hathaway. John Train described Warren Buffett as 85% influenced by Benjamin Graham and 15% by Philip Fisher.

== Works ==
- Paths to Wealth through Common Stocks, Prentice-Hall, Inc., 1960
- Conservative Investors Sleep Well, Harper & Row, 1975
- Developing an Investment Philosophy (Monograph), The Financial Analysts Research Foundation, 1980
- Common Stocks and Uncommon Profits, Harper & Brothers; Revised edition (December 1960)

== See also ==
- Thomas Rowe Price, Jr.
- John Burr Williams
- Growth investing
