= Bayhawks =

Bayhawks may refer to:

- Erie BayHawks (disambiguation), several basketball teams in Erie, Pennsylvania
- Chesapeake Bayhawks, a Major League Lacrosse team in Annapolis, Maryland
- Bayhawk, the mascot of Bristol Community College
- Bayhawk, the mascot of St. Dominic High School (Oyster Bay, New York)
- Bayhawks, the mascot of Bellingham High School (Bellingham, Washington)

== See also ==
- Osprey
