= Eddie C. Brown =

American businessman

Eddie Brown
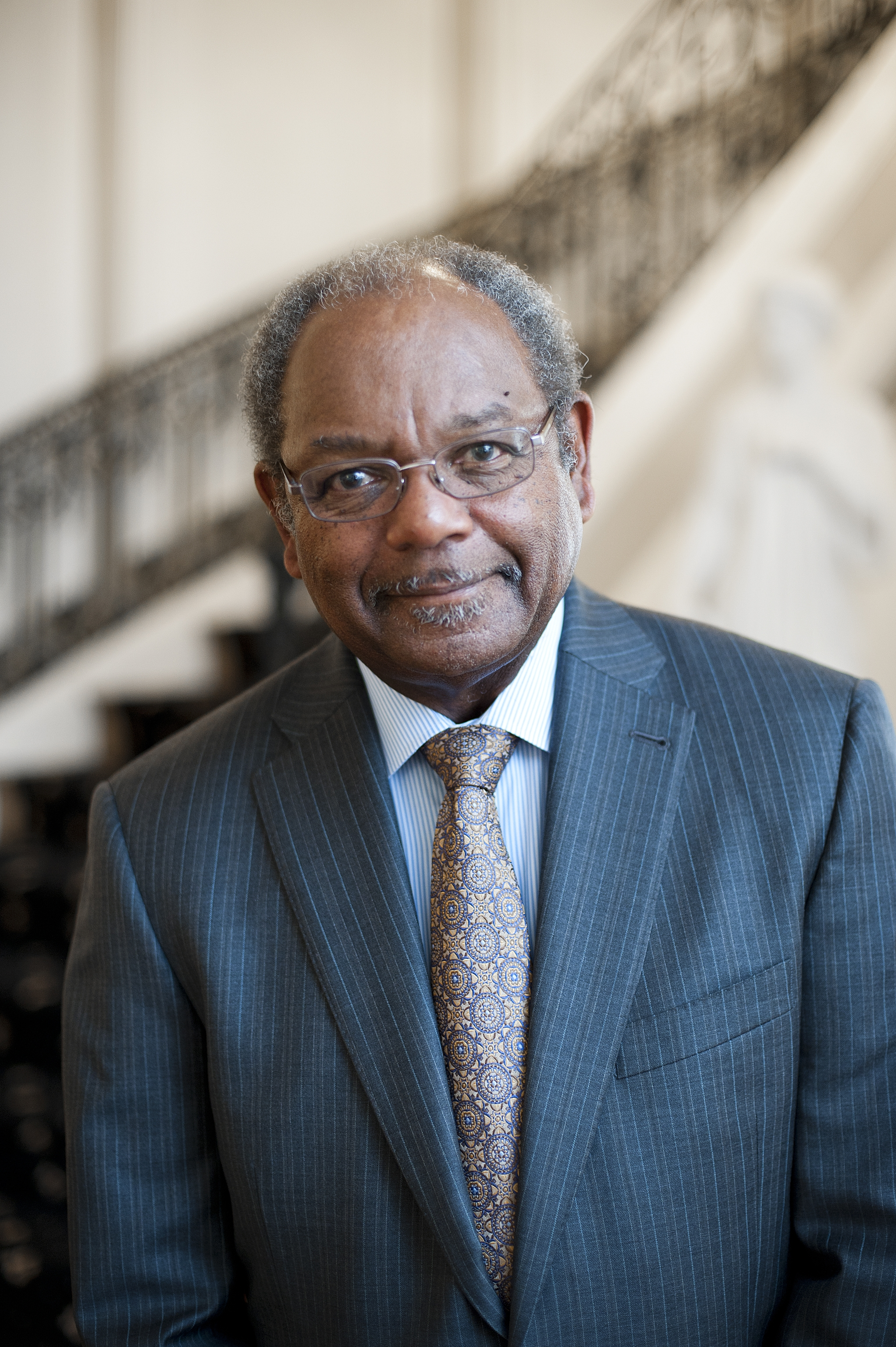
- Brown in July 2011
- Born: 1940 (age 85–86); Apopka, Florida, U.S.
- Education: Howard University (BS); Indiana University (MBA)

Eddie Carl Brown (born November 26, 1940) is an American investment manager, entrepreneur, and philanthropist. He is the founder and president of Brown Capital Management, a Baltimore-based firm that has amassed over $10 billion under management since its 1983 founding. Brown and his wife, Sylvia, have given millions to various charitable causes under the aegis of the Baltimore-based Eddie C. and C. Sylvia Brown Family Foundation.

== Early life and education ==
Brown was born to 13-year-old Annie Mae Brown in Apopka, Florida, a rural hamlet in Central Florida, where agriculture dominated the local economy and Jim Crow laws, prior to their repeal, kept blacks and whites rigidly ensconced in separate, unequal, worlds. Brown's mother left when she was 15, after which Brown’s grandparents Jake and Mamie Brown Sr. and his uncle, Jake Brown Jr. raised him. Brown’s academic excellence manifested in elementary school, prompting his grandmother to pay for a typewriter and typing lessons for her grandson. She was determined to have him avoid performing manual labor in the Apopka citrus groves that supported his grandparents. Brown still types proficiently enough to dash out 60 error-free words per minute.

When Brown was six, his entrepreneurial Uncle Jake taught him how to drive a flatbed truck, enabling fruit pickers to load boxes of oranges, grapefruit, and tangerines in Apopka’s citrus groves. Jake also ran a thriving moonshine enterprise in central Florida and under his tutelage, Brown was piloting hotrods filled with white lightning by the time he was 11.

A disapproving relative quietly contacted Brown’s mother, who snatched her son out of Apopka and relocated him to Allentown, Pennsylvania. Brown attended an integrated high school in Allentown, where he continued to be a top academic performer. He graduated with honors from Allentown High School, one of five African Americans out of a class of 760 students.

Brown had no realistic prospect of attending college until a white woman who owned a casket-making business in Allentown offered to subsidize his higher education. Brown never met his benefactor, whose offer was made through a proxy. One of his lifelong regrets is never having thanked her face-to-face. Brown has a passionate interest in philanthropy. His benefactor’s largesse allowed Brown to earn a B.S. in electrical engineering in 1961 from Howard University in Washington, D.C.

== Career ==
After graduating from Howard University, Brown worked for a few months with defense contractor Martin Marietta in Orlando, Florida, where he did quality control work on Titan Intercontinental ballistic missiles. That ended after Brown was called into Army service as a lieutenant at Fort Monmouth, New Jersey, to satisfy a military obligation Brown incurred when he joined the Army Reserve Officers' Training Corps at Howard University. Following two years on active duty as a Signal Corps officer, Brown joined IBM’s Systems Development Division in Poughkeepsie, New York. Brown spent five years designing computer circuits for large mainframe computers while employed by IBM, and also earned a master's degree in electrical engineering from New York University in New York City.

At IBM, Brown became increasingly fascinated with finance and investing and began utilizing an IBM management development program that allowed him to earn a Master of Business Administration from Indiana University School of Business in 1970. Eager to learn everything he could about wealth creation and use it for his family's benefit, Brown joined Irwin Management Co., in Columbus, Indiana, eventually becoming a member of the money management firm’s marketable securities group.

In 1973, Brown moved to Baltimore to take a position as a portfolio manager with investment firm T. Rowe Price. A decade later, Brown left to start Brown Capital Management, which initially operated out of his suburban Baltimore home. A valuation-conscious investor, Brown put his company's focus on stocks offering growth-at-a-reasonable-price, or GARP. Brown Capital Management caters to high-net-worth individuals, pension and profit sharing plans, charitable organizations and corporations.

In the early years of Brown Capital Management, Brown’s ability to attract investors received a welcome boost when he became a regular panelist on the PBS financial television program Wall $treet Week with Louis Rukeyser, which was popular during the 1980s and 1990s. "Ed is one of the most careful, and successful, students of securities alive today, and he gives us the specifics of what’s on his list," Rukeyser said of Brown.

Brown Capital Management celebrated its 30th year in business in 2013, occupies a three-story building at 1201 North Calvert Street in downtown Baltimore and has 37 employees.

=== Recognition ===
Brown has received an impressive number of awards and encomiums, to include the Woodrow Wilson Award for Public Service. Brown was also Maryland Life magazine’s 2006 Maryland of Distinction, an honor former Republican Maryland Governor Robert Ehrlich Jr., said stemmed from Brown’s "tireless dedication to improving the lives of others and making your communities better places to live."

The founder of Brown Capital Management was also recognized in Black Enterprise magazine's 40th Anniversary Issue in a 2010 article that ran under the headline “Titans: 40 Most Powerful African Americans in Business.” Brown and his wife, Sylvia, were also the recipients of the 2011 Ronald H. Brown American Journey Award by the Ron Brown Scholars Program, a national college scholarship program.

Brown and his wife, C. Sylvia Brown, were jointly awarded Honorary Doctor of Humane Letters degrees from Johns Hopkins University on May 23, 2013. The degrees were bestowed during the University's Commencement ceremony in Baltimore.

=== Politics ===
Brown has been a stalwart supporter of Democratic Party politicians and policies over the years, to include the 2008 presidential campaign of Barack Obama.

=== Philanthropy ===
Brown and his wife Sylvia have faithfully backed causes that improve inner-city Baltimore paradigms, usually through an association with health care, education, or the arts. The Browns’ contributions are typically funneled through the Eddie C. and C. Sylvia Brown Family Foundation. One beneficiary has been the Turning the Corner Achievement Program (TCAP), which focuses on attaining improved educational and social outcomes for inner-city Baltimore youths. The Browns’ foundation has committed $5 million to TCAP since 2002.

=== Books and articles ===
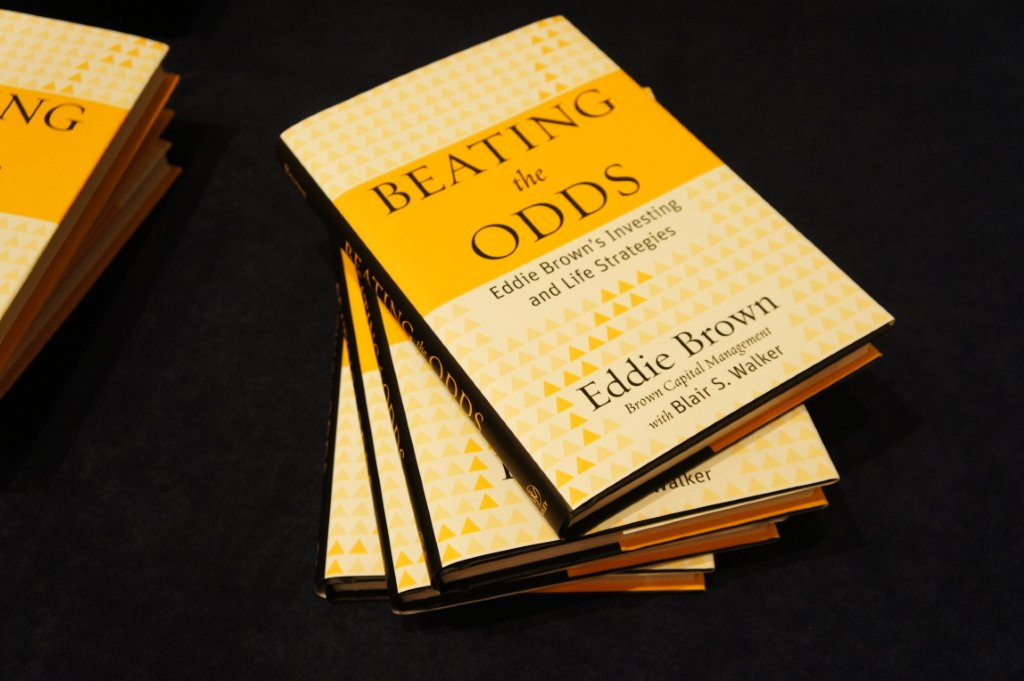
Beating the Odds, Brown's autobiography, published in May 2011

Brown's 240-page autobiography, Beating the Odds: Eddie Brown’s Investing and Life Strategies, was published in May 2011 by John Wiley & Sons. Brown is also the subject of an article titled “Where to Find Reasonably Priced Growth Stocks” written by Christopher C. Williams and published by Barrons on January 11, 2010.

== Personal life ==
Brown married his college sweetheart from Howard University, the former Sylvia Thurston, on August 11, 1962, in King William, Virginia. The Browns have two daughters and three grandsons. Brown tried to attend helicopter flight school while he was a lieutenant in the U.S. Army, but was rejected after the vision in one eye failed to pass visual acuity standards. He later obtained a private pilots license for civilian fixed-wing aircraft, but stopped flying after his flights started to become too infrequent for him to remain proficient.

Brown’s primary residence is in suburban Baltimore, and he maintains homes in Florida and Maine.
