= Glyndon, Maryland =

Unincorporated community in Baltimore County, Maryland, US

Glyndon is an unincorporated community in Baltimore County, Maryland, United States. Founded in 1871 by Dr. Charles A. Leas, the village is located in the northwest section of Baltimore County and is primarily a residential suburb of metropolitan Baltimore City. Glyndon is listed on the National Register of Historic Places (1973) and on the Maryland Inventory of Historic Properties (1973); the Glyndon Historic District was also designated as the first historic district in Baltimore County (1981). Glyndon is also known for its yearly 4th of July parade.

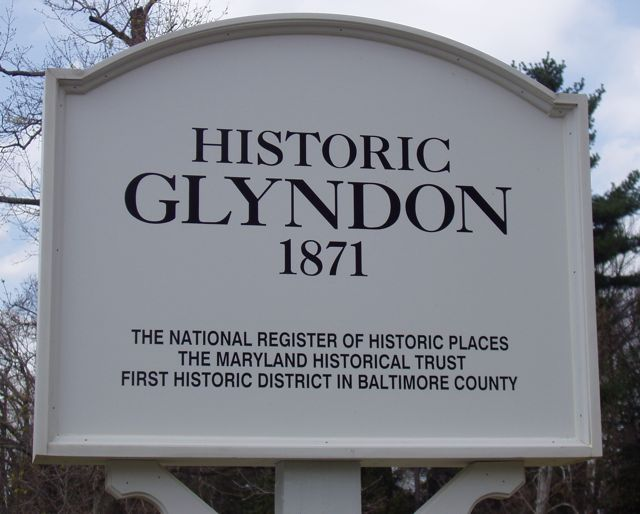
A roadside sign marking Historic Glyndon.

== History ==
The arrival of the Western Maryland Railway in 1860 promoted the early location and growth of Glyndon.

Prior to 1871, Dr. Charles A. Leas, the first health officer of Baltimore City and a former American consul, made several purchases of land in what is now Glyndon. When he discovered that farming was not his metier, he decided to found a small town. He employed the Baltimore surveyor Augustus Bouldin to lay out the lots and streets, planting rows of maples along the avenues. Baltimore County businessman Samuel P. Townsend also promoted the growth of the town with his purchase and development of a substantial number of acres. He assumed an active role in the community as a merchant, a railroad agent, and a postmaster.

Affluent Baltimoreans acquired summer homes in early Glyndon to escape the heat of the city. The proximity of the railroad to Glyndon allowed easy commuting for the businessmen to their jobs in the city some 25 miles away. Two- and three-story Victorian homes, with large airy rooms, wide halls from front to rear, and spacious porches, was the type of architecture chosen by the majority of the builders. Additionally, several boarding houses invited city folks to live in the country during the summer months.

A small business district grew up around the railroad station to service the needs of Glyndon's growing population. Besides the station, along Railroad Avenue there were a post office, a general store, a town hall, a blacksmith shop, a livery, a wheelwright shop, and an ice cream parlor. Along nearby Chatsworth Avenue (originally Reisterstown Avenue) there were a general store, a bakery, a butchery, an ice house, a carpenter, and the town magistrate's office.

The Western Maryland Railway and a later streetcar line, the Pikesville, Reisterstown & Emory Grove Railway, also brought summer people to Emory Grove, a Methodist religious campground founded before Glyndon in 1868. Across Butler Road (what was then called Dover Road) to the south is Glyndon Park, established in 1887 as a temperance camp meeting ground, the first of its kind in the nation south of the Mason and Dixon's Line.

In 1878, the Glyndon United Methodist Church (then called the Glyndon Methodist Episcopal Church) was constructed on Dover Road. The original brown-shingled chapel was destroyed by fire in 1929 and the present stone structure was dedicated in 1931. In 1873 the cornerstone was laid for Sacred Heart Church. The Gothic structure was built with marble from the nearby quarry at the foot of “Dark Hollow Hill” (the Hill now being part of Butler Road).

There were two schools in the immediate area. St. George's Hallm located at the end of Central Avenue where Bond Avenue crosses the railroad tracks (506 Bond), was established by Prof. J. C. Kinear in 1876 as a private boarding school for boys. The original building was destroyed by fire in 1896; it was replaced with the current structure.

The two-room Glyndon School on Butler Road was built in 1887 when the growing year-round population of Glyndon necessitated a public school. The school house was abandoned in 1930 after consolidation with Franklin Elementary School in Reisterstown. In 1932 it became the home of the Woman's Club of Glyndon. The Club was originally established in 1898 by some ladies who were “summering” in Glyndon and who gathered on a regular basis on a neighbor's porch to read together. They called themselves the Glyndon Porch Class.

== Geography ==
Glyndon is located at a latitude of 39.4764935 North and a longitude of 76.8158100 West at an elevation of 689 feet. Butler Road, formerly Dover Road, is the main road.

== Demographics ==
According to the 2000 census, the population of Glyndon was 424 (female 210, male 214). The median age was 39.6. The average household size was 2.72 and the average family size 3.30. The population was 96.5% White, 1.2% Black, 0.5% Asian, 1.9% of two or more races and 0.2% Hispanic/Latino. Of the population aged 25 and over, 96.1% had achieved high school graduation or higher and 51.3% a bachelor's degree or higher.

== Education ==
=== Public schools ===
The public schools serving the children of Glyndon are:

- Franklin Elementary, Glyndon Elementary (opened 1978)
- Franklin Middle
- Franklin High

== Notable residents ==
- Dr. Charles A. Leas founded Glyndon. The entrance to the Leas homestead, the oldest home in Glyndon, is located at the corner of Albright and Railroad avenues. The main part of the dwelling, more than 200 years old, was originally a farmhouse.
- Thomas Rowe Price Jr., founder of the investment firm T. Rowe Price, was born in Glyndon in 1898 and spent his childhood there in the home that his father built at 4801 Butler Road.
