= Thomas Rowe Price Jr. =

American businessman (1898-1983)

- Born: March 16, 1898; Glyndon, Maryland, U.S.
- Died: October 20, 1983 (aged 85); Baltimore, Maryland, U.S.
- Resting place: Druid Ridge Cemetery
- Education: Swarthmore College
- Occupations: Investment banker; Businessman
- Spouse: Eleanor Baily Gherky Price (m. 1927; died 1981)
- Children: 2

Thomas Rowe Price Jr. (March 16, 1898 – October 20, 1983) was the founder of T. Rowe Price, an American publicly owned investment firm, established in 1937 and headquartered in Baltimore, Maryland. The company offers mutual funds, subadvisory services, and separate account management for individuals, institutions, retirement plans, and financial intermediaries. Along with Philip Fisher, Price was an early proponent of the growth investing strategy.

== Early life ==
Price was born on March 16, 1898, to Thomas Rowe Price Sr. and Ella Stewart Black, in Glyndon, Maryland, near Baltimore. His father was a graduate of the University of Maryland School of Medicine, as was his grandfather Benjamin F. Price. Thomas Sr. served as a surgeon for the Western Maryland Railroad for many decades as well as a local "country doctor" for Glyndon, and was the attending physician at the birth of his own children. Price's mother Ella was the daughter of Samuel Black, a prominent builder and contractor in Baltimore, and the aunt of S. Duncan Black, one of the two founders of the electric tool company Black and Decker based in Towson, Maryland.

Price attended the Glyndon School in Glyndon, Maryland, as well as Franklin High School in what is now Reisterstown, Maryland, and, briefly, the Friends School of Baltimore. In 1919, he received a bachelor's degree in chemistry from Swarthmore College, where he was a member of Delta Upsilon fraternity. In 1927, Price married Eleanor Baily Gherky, originally of Philadelphia, Pennsylvania, who was then attending Goucher College in Baltimore. Eleanor's father, William D. Gherky, was an inventor and engineer who had been a "former research associate of Thomas Alva Edison" and had helped to convert major American cities such as New York, Boston, Chicago, Columbus, Philadelphia, and Baltimore from gas and steam power to electricity. Together, they had two sons.

With his degree in chemistry, Price initially sought a career with the chemical company DuPont. However, he soon realized that he was more interested in money management than scientific research, and left DuPont to join a series of small investment firms and brokerages.

== Career ==
After a decade spent at three investment firms and brokerages, Price formed a particular vision for the operation of an investment firm that specifically combined a focus on growth investing with a no-load (commission) fee system for clients. Price believed commission sales were potentially unethical, as they might incentive stock sales regardless of company quality or suitability to clients. He instead emphasized a compensation system based on an annual percentage fee of total assets under management which he argued aligned a fund manager's interests with his clients.

By the mid-1930s, Price had risen to the head of investment for the firm MacKubin, Legg and Co. (a precursor to present-day investment firm Legg Mason), but found himself continually clashing with his colleagues who focused on commission-based value investing. With three other colleagues from MacKubin in tow, Rowe set out to form his own firm, which he established in 1937 and named T. Rowe Price and Associates. T. Rowe Price, as it is named today, is a Baltimore-headquartered multinational investment and mutual fund firm that manages billions of dollars per annum. Price personally managed the firm until he sold his shares in the company in 1966 and retired in 1971.

Price is best known for defining and promoting the concept of growth stocks, for which he has been called "the father of growth investing". He believed that investors could earn superior returns by investing in well-managed companies in fertile fields whose earnings and dividends could be expected to grow faster than inflation and the overall economy. The core of Price's approach, proprietary research to guide investment selection and diversification to reduce risk, has remained part of the firm's principles. Instead of charging a commission, as others in the business did at the time, Price charged a fee based on the assets under management, which binds the success of the investment firm to the success of the portfolio and stocks invested in.

Price died in 1983, after which the Price family no longer took part in the running of the company. The firm, now named T. Rowe Price Associates, went public in 1986 and was added to the S&P 500 Index in 1999.
