= Cathedral Preparatory School =

Location
- 225 West 9th Street; Erie, Pennsylvania 16501; United States; 42°7′27″N 80°5′17″W

Information
- School type: Independent college-preparatory high school
- Motto: "Developing men and women of vision in spirit, mind, and body"
- Religious affiliation: Christianity
- Denomination: Roman Catholic
- Patron saints: Mary, Queen of Prep
- Established: 1921
- Founder: John Mark Gannon
- Sister school: Villa Maria Academy
- Oversight: Roman Catholic Diocese of Erie
- CEEB code: 391275
- NCES School ID: 01190189
- President: Jason Ladecour
- Administrator: Veronica Seip
- Chaplain: Father Ben Daghir
- Faculty: 35.4 (on an FTE basis)
- Grades: 9–12
- Gender: Co-ed
- Enrollment: 469 (2019-2020)
  - Grade 9: 116
  - Grade 10: 108
  - Grade 11: 120
  - Grade 12: 125
- Student to teacher ratio: 1:13.2
- Hours in school day: 7.1
- Campus type: Small city
- Colors: Orange and Black
- Song: "Loyal and True"
- Athletics conference: PIAA
- Mascot: Victor E. Ram
- Nickname: Ramblers
- Accreditation: MSA
- Publication: Literulae
- Newspaper: The Rambler
- Website: prep-villa.com

Cathedral Preparatory School (often referred to simply as Prep) is a private, Roman Catholic, college-preparatory high school for girls and boys in Erie, Pennsylvania, United States. It was established in 1921 by Archbishop John Mark Gannon and is located in the Roman Catholic Diocese of Erie.

== History ==
Classes were originally located under St. Peter's Cathedral. The school is now located behind the cathedral.

On Friday, August 12, 1921, Bishop John Mark Gannon summoned the pastors of Erie's twelve parishes to meet to discuss the "lack of Catholic education for high school boys in the city." "Many Catholics," he claimed, "although highly intelligent and deserving, were denied the chance to receive a preparatory education because they were poor." His goal was to establish a school that "provided the moral, intellectual, social, and physical training designed to prepare (men) to live in our democratic society..." Thus, the Cathedral Preparatory School for Boys was established in the fall of 1921. The new school was located in the hastily remodeled basement of St. Peter's Cathedral. The faculty consisted of four priests and one layperson. Tuition was $50 and paid for by the students' parishes. In 1925, the first graduating class of 43 men became alumni. In 1929, Bill Ring of the Erie Dispatch-Herald began referring to the Cathedral team as the "Ramblers." Mr. Ring's inspiration was the University of Notre Dame's 1920's nickname.

The school renovated the halls and classrooms of all four floors in its main building. The project, which included the installation of new windows, ceilings, walls, lockers, lighting fixtures, carpeting, and technology infrastructure, has a projected completion cost of $3 million. It recently completed a $1 million renovation to the science wing and auditorium. On September 10, 2010, it officially opened the Cathedral Prep Events Center (now known as the Hagerty Family Events Center), a new athletic complex for football, basketball, swimming, water polo, soccer, lacrosse, and track and field. A 1,800-seat gymnasium and a 400-seat natatorium, complete with an Olympic-sized pool, a new wrestling room, and a weight room, were recently completed on the corner of 12th and Cherry Streets for a cost of over $10 million.

== Curriculum ==
Students must take courses in English, history, mathematics, religion, foreign languages, and science, as well as completing 100 hours of community service. Additionally, every student must take the SAT to graduate. Cathedral Prep bases acceptance to the first-year class on the results of the mandatory entrance exam, elementary school transcripts, school disciplinary records, and recommendations from the elementary school teachers and principal. In 2019, 127 students graduated from Cathedral Preparatory School, and 100% of the graduating class was accepted into a four-year college.

== Extracurricular activities ==
=== Athletics ===
The school is a member of the Pennsylvania Interscholastic Athletic Association (PIAA) in PIAA District 10. Prep offers 13 varsity sports as well as many JV and freshman sports. On September 10, 2010, it officially opened the Hagerty Family Events Center, a new football-specific athletic complex. Each year, its basketball team hosts the Burger King Classic.

=== Student section ===
The school's student cheering section, particularly at football and basketball games, is widely known.

== Notable alumni ==
- Leonard Calabrese, physician and HIV/AIDS researcher at the Cleveland Clinic
- David Elliot Cohen, author and editor
- Gregory Karle, attorney
- Nick Palmieri, NHL player
- Harry Markopolos, financial fraud investigator and whistleblower of Madoff investment scandal
- Mike McCoy, NFL player
- Tom Ridge, former Governor of Pennsylvania, and first United States Secretary of Homeland Security
- Jean Salata, founder of BPEA EQT
- Bob Sanders, NFL player
- Mark Stepnoski, NFL player
- Louis J. Tullio, former Mayor of Erie
- Alfred Michael Watson, former Bishop of the Roman Catholic Diocese of Erie
- Ted Weschler, investment manager at Berkshire Hathaway
- Ryan Zapolski, professional ice hockey goaltender
- Juice Scruggs, NFL player
- Carter Starocci, freestyle and folkstyle wrestler, five-time NCAA champion for Penn State
