= Burger King Classic =

Basketball tournament

- Current Classic logo
- Formerly: McDonald's Classic
- Sport: High school basketball
- Founded: 1983
- Founder: Ron Sertz
- CEO: Bill Flanagan
- Motto: "The Nation's Best"
- No. of teams: 4
- Venues: Hagerty Family Events Center, Erie, Pennsylvania
- Most recent champion: Neumann-Goretti (PA)
- Most titles: Rice High (NY) & St. Edward (OH) (4)
- Qualification: Invitational

The Burger King Basketball Classic, formerly known as the McDonald's Classic from 1983 to 2010, is a four-team boys high school basketball invitational tournament held each year since 1983 in Erie, Pennsylvania.

Since its inception in 1983, the Burger King Classic has been considered one of the best four-team high school tournaments in the country. Maxpreps.com and Eddie Oliver from Hoops USA called it "the best" and ESPN.com has called it one of the most impactful events of MLK weekend. Each year, nationally ranked teams with future NCAA Division-I and NBA players travel to Erie to battle for the championship and the opportunity to play against other top talent.

The Burger King Classic has hosted the nation's top-ranked team eight times, over 25 state champions and nearly two dozen All-Americans and future NBA players. Hosted by Cathedral Preparatory School, the tournament has drawn thousands of basketball fans from across the nation each year. Archbishop Wood (PA) is the defending Classic champions while Rice (NY) and St. Edward (OH) has won the tournament a record four times each.

== The Classic ==
=== Classic history ===
McDonald's Classic logo, used from 1983 to 2010

The Burger King Classic has been played at three locations in its history. The Erie Insurance Arena was used to house the tournament in the 1980s. In 1989, the location was moved to Gannon University's Hammermill Center. In 2016, the tournament was moved to the JoAnn Mullen Gymnasium at the Hagerty Family Events Center. The Classic is held in mid-January over a Friday and Saturday.

Ron Sertz, former Cathedral Prep Athletic Director and Director of Operations for the Erie Otters, founded the tournament and ran it for its first 25 years of existence. In 1983, after a year as athletic director at Cathedral Prep, he decided to begin a top-level tip-off classic for the community.

This tip-off tournament became the McDonald's Classic in 1983 and brought in three strong teams (Beaver Falls of PA, Bishop Loughlin of Brooklyn, NY, and Roman Catholic of Philadelphia, PA). The tournament was considered a success with Bishop Loughlin being crowned as the first Classic Champion, defeating the host Cathedral Prep Ramblers 70–63. Sertz decided to move the tournament into even more prominence and began to work harder and harder on bringing even stronger and more recognized teams every year. During the 25th anniversary of the Classic in 2008, Sertz announced his retirement as classic director. He was replaced by current Cathedral Prep Athletic Director Bill Flanagan.

In 2010, Burger King signed a multi-year sponsorship deal with the Classic, taking the event's title away from rival McDonald's, who had held the moniker since 1983.

=== Event schedule ===
The tournament is composed of four teams in a round-robin format. Classic teams usually arrive on the Thursday before the tournament begins. Each team is assigned a host from Cathedral Prep who caters to them for the entire day, makes sure they get to meals, and finds places they wish to visit. Each team is given rooms at the Sheraton Erie Bay front Hotel.

Thursday is usually spent as a time to settle in for each team. On Friday, practices are scheduled by the host for each team to attend. Each practice is held at Cathedral Prep's gymnasium and is usually a shoot-around for the team. The first game normally tips off Friday night at 7:00.

On Saturday, teams may schedule a shoot-around at the Prep gymnasium if they wish or they may travel around Erie. The consolation match takes place at 7:00 between the two teams who lost the previous night and then the night is highlighted by the Classic Championship at 8:30. After the championship game, a presentation ceremony takes place and words are said from the winning coach on the tournament. Sunday morning the teams return to their respective schools.

== The host ==
Since its inception in 1983, the Classic has been hosted by Cathedral Prep of Erie, Pennsylvania. Cathedral Prep is a co-educational Roman Catholic high school in Erie, Pennsylvania, in the Roman Catholic Diocese of Erie. Prep, as the school is commonly called in Erie, was established in 1921 by then Bishop John Mark Gannon. Bishop Gannon founded Prep as an all-male Catholic high school.

The Cathedral Prep basketball team has won two PIAA Basketball Championships (1980 and 1993) and four PCIAA (Pennsylvania Catholic Interscholastic Athletic Association) in 1953, 1954, 1968 and 1971. Cathedral Prep has turned out a total of 22 Division 1 basketball players in its 100+ years. In its role as the host team, Prep has always played the second, or 8:30, game of the first round. Various members of the school provide meals, direction and other services for the visiting teams as well as help out at the games themselves with things like photography, trophy presentation and security.

== Classic history ==
1983

Champions: Bishop Loughlin, Brooklyn, NY

Bishop Loughlin 93, Beaver Falls 66

Cathedral Prep 54, Roman Catholic 52 (OT)

Consolation: Roman Catholic 57, Beaver Falls 46

Championship: Bishop Loughlin 70, Cathedral Prep 63

The first Classic runs as a tip-off tournament as Cathedral Prep stuns Philadelphia Roman Catholic in overtime on opening night.
The host Ramblers would go on to lose to New York powerhouse Bishop Loughlin, 70-63. Prep would go on to the state finals.

1984

Champions: Christ the King, NY

Christ the King 64, VA Benedictine 52

Williamsport 51, Cathedral Prep 50

Consolation: Cathedral Prep 63, Benedictine 48

Championship: Christ the King 61, Williamsport 53

New York state champion Christ the King hands defending Pennsylvania champ Williamsport a loss in the finals.
Prep loses 51-50 to the Millionaires on the first night of action but would bounce back with a consolation-game win over Benedictine.

1985

Champions: Hopkinsville HS, KY

DeMatha Catholic 58, Canton McKinley 41

Hopkinsville 61, Cathedral Prep 50

Consolation: Cathedral Prep 46, Canton McKinley 41

Championship: Hopkinsville 74, DeMatha 69

DeMatha Catholic enters the Classic as the #1 ranked team in the nation, but leaves a unhappy victim to Hopkinsville High, the Kentucky state champs, 74-69. Meanwhile the host Ramblers get a confenient win in the consolation game versus Ohio power Canton McKinley.

1986

Champions: St. Joseph HS, Cleveland, OH

Cleveland St. Joseph 79, Roman Catholic 64

Meadville (PA) 60, Cathedral Prep 44

Consolation: Cathedral Prep 59, Roman Catholic 58

Championship: St. Joseph 65, Meadville 58

Cleveland St. Joseph comes to Erie featuring the tallest front line in America. Superstar Treg Lee leads the Vikings to a 65-58 victory in the finals over Meadville, a team that would make it all the way to the PA State AAAA championship game.

1987

Champions: Cathedral Prep

Oak Hill Academy 86, NY St. Anthony 52

Cathedral Prep 56, McDowell (Erie) 54

Consolation: St. Anthony 62, McDowell 60

Championship: Cathedral Prep 58, Oak Hill 48

Coach Marcel Arribi makes his coaching debut at Prep and sneaks past archrival McDowell, 56-54, on opening night. Then the Ramblers pull off one of the most stunning upsets in Prep history in the finals by handing top-ranked national power Oak Hill Academy.

1988

No tournament played. Tournament moved from a season tip-off into January and from the Civic Center to Gannon University.

1989

Champions: St. Anthony, NJ

St. Anthony 69, Admiral King 50

Cleveland St. Joseph 61, Cathedral Prep 38

Consolation: Admiral King 51, Cathedral Prep 50

Championship: St. Anthony 65, St. Joseph 47

National Champion New Jersey St. Anthony, led by Bobby Hurley, Terry Dehere and Jerry Walker, make easy pickings of Admiral King and Cleveland St. Joseph en route to an undefeated season.

1990

Champions: Oak Hill Academy, VA

Oak Hill 86, Meadville (PA) 49

Cathedral Prep 68, Baltimore Dunbar 62

Consolation: Baltimore Dunbar 72, Meadville 48

Championship: Oak Hill 76, Cathedral Prep 63

Oak Hill Academy, led by Anthony Cade, returns to the Classic as America's top-rated team and gains a measure of revenge for their loss in 1987 by handling Prep in the title tilt.

1991

Champions: Cathedral Prep

Bishop Loughlin 71, Detroit Country Day 69

Cathedral Prep 82, Connecticut St. Joseph 65

Consolation: Detroit Country Day 87, St. Joseph 68

Championship: Cathedral Prep 70, Bishop Loughlin 69

Detroit Country Day, led by unanimous All-American Chris Webber, came to the Classic as the favorites, but were upset in the first round by Brooklyn's Bishop Loughlin, who were led by Kentucky-bound Andre Riddick. Loughlin's joy was short-lived, however, as they fell victim to the host Ramblers on a last-second 3-pointer by Jim Hamilton.

1992

Champions: Baltimore Dunbar, MD

Baltimore Dunbar 66, Oak Hill Academy 57

Dayton Dunbar 71, Cathedral Prep 66

Consolation: Oak Hill 70, Cathedral Prep 28

Championship: Baltimore Dunbar 82, Dayton Dunbar 66

This year again featured the nation's top-ranked team, Baltimore Dunbar, and the Poets live up to advance billing by thrashing #3 Oak Hill on opening night, then crushing Dayton Dunbar in the finals. Dunbar would finish the season as National Champions.

1993

Champions: Cathedral Prep

LaSalle Academy 48, Bishop Loughlin 47

Cathedral Prep 53, Middletown 44

Consolation: Bishop Loughlin 83, Middletown 45

Championship: Cathedral Prep 38, LaSalle 32

Bishop Loughlin makes a third Classic appearance as the favorites, but does not make the finals due to an upset loss to New York LaSalle Academy. Ed Elisma, a 6'10" shot-blocker, is touted as New York City's finest and leads LaSalle into the finals against Prep. But the Ramblers stun LaSalle to win their third Classic crown.

1994

Champions: Rice HS, NY

Rice 78, St. Patrick 49

Villa-Angela St. Joseph 71, Cathedral Prep 61

Consolation: Cathedral Prep 62, St. Patrick 47

Championship: Rice 80, Villa-Angela St. Joseph 58

Rice High School arrives in Erie as the #1 team in the country, led by the nation's best player, Felipe Lopez. The Raiders do not disappoint as they demolish St. Patrick, 78-49, and Villa-Angela St. Joseph, 80-58. Prep defeat St. Patrick 62-47 to win the consolation.

1995

Champions: Paterson Catholic, NJ

Paterson Catholic 69, Simon Gratz 66

Cathedral Prep 59, Chester 52

Consolation: Simon Gratz 64, Chester 46

Championship: Paterson Catholic 62, Cathedral Prep 55

Paterson Catholic gets a record 41 points from the nation's #1 player, Tim Thomas, to edge Simon Gratz, 69-66, on opening night. Prep's own All-American, Jed Ryan, notches 31 the same night to lead the Ramblers over Chester High, 59-52. Paterson wins the title over Prep, 62-55, as Thomas garners 23 more points for a tournament-record 62.

1996

Champions: Paterson Catholic, NJ

Paterson Catholic 65, LaSalle 51

St. Frances 86, Cathedral Prep 60

Consolation: LaSalle 44, Cathedral Prep 40 (2OT)

Championship: Paterson Catholic 70, St. Frances, 50

Paterson Catholic becomes the Classic's first repeat champion with a relatively easy 70-50 title game conquest of St. Frances from Baltimore. Tim Thomas, in his second Classic, scored 29 points in the championship game, added to the 25 he compiled on opening night in a 65-51 ousting of LaSalle Academy. Prep finished fourth after a loss to St. Frances, 86-60, and a heartbreaking double overtime defeat to LaSalle, 44-40.

1997

Champions: St. Edward, Lakewood, OH

St. Edward 68, Detroit Country Day, 61

Cathedral Prep 63, Admiral King 44

Consolation: Admiral King 63, Detroit Country Day 62 (OT)

Championship: St. Edward 52, Cathedral Prep 41

Prep neutralizes All-American Sam Clancey, who scores only nine points, but Steve Logan and Gino Bartalone combine for 27 tallies to lead St. Edward to the crown over the Ramblers, 52-41. In the consolation contest, Javin Hunter's 30 points is not enough, and Detroit Country Day falls to Admiral King 63-62 in overtime.

1998

Champions: Rice HS, NY

Rice 81, Simon Gratz 45

Hatboro Horsham 69, Cathedral Prep 46

Consolation: Cathedral Prep 51, Simon Gratz 42

Championship: Rice 80, Hatboro-Horsham 61

Rice High School becomes only the third team in Classic history to win more than one title by dominating Hatboro-Horsham 80-61, led by Anthony Glover. All-American Matt Carroll scored 25 points in the opener to lead Hatboro Horsham over Prep, but the Ramblers bounced backed with a solid 51-42 consolation win against Simon Gratz.

1999

Champions: St. Patrick High, NJ

St. Patrick 55, Westchester 47

Archbishop Carroll 54, Cathedral Prep 47

Consolation: Westchester 65, Cathedral Prep 45

Championship: St. Patrick 57, Archbishop Carroll 45

New Jersey St. Patrick avenged their disappointing 1994 performance and won the Classic Crown with an opening night 55-47 win over L.A. Westchester and a 57-45 finals victory against Washington Archbishop Carroll. Jerome Holman and Samuel Dalembert were Celtic standouts. Prep lost both nights to Carroll, 54-47, and Westchester, 65-45.

2000

Champions: LaSalle Academy, NY

Williamsport 70, Simon Gratz 52

LaSalle Academy 59, Cathedral Prep 44

Consolation: Simon Gratz 59, Cathedral Prep 30

Championship: LaSalle 63, Williamsport 55

LaSalle Academy finally takes home a Classic crown, led by Rodney Epperson and Famous Brown. Defending Pennsylvania AAAA champ Williamsport, featuring All-American Chevy Troutman, is the victim 63-55. LaSalle defeated Prep, 59-44, on opening night, while Williamsport dismantled Simon Gratz, 70-52. Gratz routed Prep, 59-30 in the consolation.

2001

Champions: Rice High School, NY

Rice 77, LaSalle Academy 46

Lexington Catholic 74, Cathedral Prep 66

Consolation: LaSalle 49, Cathedral Prep 47

Championship: Rice 79, Lexington Catholic 61

Rice High School won their third Classic title with a 79-61 win over Lexington Catholic. Shagari Alleyne, a 7'4" sophomore sensation, teamed with Ken Eusey for 43 points. LaSalle Academy nudged Prep, 49-47, for consolation honors. Rice blasted last year's champs, LaSalle, 77-46 and Jack Heissenbuttel led Lexington over Prep 74-66 on opening night.

2002

Champions: Westchester, Los Angeles, CA

Westchester 93, Washington Dunbar 51

Chester 54, Cathedral Prep 48

Consolation: Cathedral Prep 69, Dunbar 62

Championship: Westchester 100, Chester 50

Westchester High entered the Classic as the nation's #1 team and did not disappoint. Setting tournament records for most points, rebounds and steals, the Comets easily disposed of D.C. Dunbar, 93-51, in the opener and routed Chester 100-50 to claim their first Classic title. Chester edged Prep 54-48, on opening night, but Prep, led by Andy Kubinski and Mike Sertz, bounced back to claim consolation honors, 69-62, over Dunbar.

2003

Champions: McQuaid Jesuit, Rochester, NY

Rice 59, Georgetown Prep 55 (OT)

McQuaid Jesuit 78, Cathedral Prep 50

Consolation: Georgetown Prep 49, Cathedral Prep 43

Championship: McQuaid Jesuit 69, Rice 63

McQuaid Jesuit was ranked #6 in the nation, but faced 3-time Classic champion Rice High in the finals. Rice, ranked #16, was led by 7'3" Shagari Alleyne, but Tyler Relph, Ryan Pettinella and Marty O'Sullivan combined for 55 points to lead McQuaid to a 69-63 win. McQuaid dropped Prep in the opener, 78-50, while Rice disposed of Georgetown Prep which was led by 7'2" Roy Hibbert and 6'9" Davis Nwankwo, 59-55. Georgetown grabbed consolation honors over the Ramblers, 49-43.

2004

Champions: Edgewater, Orlando, FL

Edgewater 81, Cardinal Dougherty 69

Mount Vernon 72, Cathedral Prep 43

Consolation: Cardinal Dougherty 78, Cathedral Prep 60

Championship: Edgewater 69, Mount Vernon 67

Orlando's Edgewater High lived up to their preseason billing as the nation's #1 team by beating a tenacious Mount Vernon squad, 69-67, to win the '04 Classic crown. All-American superstar Darius Washington converted a layup with only 15 seconds to play to seal the win. Mount Vernon was #4 in the national rankings. Edgewater snuck by Philadelphia Cardinal Dougherty (#7 ranking) on opening night, while Mount Vernon thrashed Prep 72-43. Dougherty made Prep 0-2 with a 78-60 consolation win.

2005

Champions: Fairley, Memphis, TN

Fairley 63, Westbury Christian 61

Bishop O'Connell 79, Cathedral Prep 58

Consolation: Westbury Christian 51, Cathedral Prep 46

Championship: Fairley 49, Bishop O'Connell 44

Fairley High from Memphis, Tennessee, pulled a mild upset of Virginia's Bishop O'Connell High, 49-44, to win the '05 Classic title. Fairley, led by Anthony Mason Jr., barely edged powerful Westbury Christian on opening night, while O'Connell, starring North Carolina-bound All-American Marcus Ginyard, pounded Prep 79-58. Prep gave a strong effort in the consolation before succumbing 51-46 to Westbury Christian.

2006

Champions: Rufus King, Milwaukee, WI

Rufus King 67, Mount Vernon 57

Cathedral Prep 88, Chester 84 (OT)

Consolation: Mount Vernon 76, Chester 67

Championship: Rufus King 65, Cathedral Prep 48

Four-time Wisconsin State Champion Rufus King High from Milwaukee rode into town and carried off the Classic championship by knocking off New York power Mount Vernon, 67-57, on opening night, and then overwhelming Cathedral Prep, 65-48, in the title tilt. Prep, which hadn't been in the finals since 1997, beat AAAA Pennsylvania champion Chester High, 88-84 in overtime to reach the championship game.

2007

Champions: St. Edward, Lakewood, OH

St. Edward 68, Westchester 65

Solon OH 63, Cathedral Prep 55

Consolation: Cathedral Prep 64, Westchester 60

Championship: St. Edward 70, Solon 41

St. Edward, led by National Junior of the Year Delvon Roe, made the short trip to Erie and won their second Classic title by edging Westchester, 68-65 in the opening round before trouncing Solon High, 70-41, in the finals. Solon had squeaked by Prep on opening night, but Prep pulled off the biggest upset in the tournament over #10 ranked Westchester, 64-60, in the consolation game.

2008

Champions: Rice, New York, NY

St. Patrick 69, St. Edward 61

Rice 87, Cathedral Prep 63

Consolation: St. Edward 60, Cathedral Prep 52

Championship: Rice 60, St. Patrick 57

Rice won their record 4th McDonald's Classic with a blowout over the host Ramblers and a tight win over St. Patrick in the finals. Attempting to defend their title without injured star Delvon Roe, St. Edward suffered their first loss in three appearances in the Classic. However, the Eagles bounced back to beat host Cathedral Prep in the consolation game.

2009

Champions: Chester, PA

Archbishop Carroll 57, Westbury Christian 50

Chester 69, Cathedral Prep 62

Consolation: Westbury Christian 58, Cathedral Prep 42

Championship: Chester 64, Archbishop Carroll 39

Coming in with a 1-5 all-time tournament record, Chester (PA) nudged the host Ramblers before pounding Washington DC's Archbishop Carroll in an anticlimactic final. Rahlir Jefferson led Chester in the final with 26 points and 11 rebounds. Houston's Westbury Christian defeated the host Ramblers in the consolation game.

2010

Champions: Penn Wood, Lansdowne, PA

Penn Wood 61, Mount Vernon 53

Nichols 68, Cathedral Prep 57

Consolation: Mount Vernon 79, Cathedral Prep 67

Championship: Penn Wood 64, Nichols 53

Defending PIAA AAAA champion Penn Wood sneaks by Classic veteran Mount Vernon and newcomer Nichols to win the Classic in their first ever appearance. Wood's Jabarie Hinds set a Classic record with nine three-pointers and 39 points against host Cathedral Prep. The Ramblers played both opponents tough, but fell by a combined 23 points. Final year as the "McDonald's Classic".

2011

Champions: Penn Wood, Lansdowne, PA

Penn Wood 57, St. Edward 55

Charlotte Christian 68, Cathedral Prep 57 (OT)

Consolation: St. Edward 70, Cathedral Prep 57

Championship: Penn Wood 64, Charlotte Christian 51

Defending McDonald's/Burger King Classic champion Penn Wood joined Paterson Catholic as the only schools to repeat as the tournament's ultimate victors, as the Patriots won a close contest with St. Edward, followed by their title-clinching triumph over newcomer Charlotte Christian. The host Ramblers extended their Classic losing-streak to eight games after an opening overtime loss to Charlotte Christian and a consolation defeat to St. Edward. First year as the 'Burger King' Classic.

2012

Champions: Milton, GA

Milton (GA) 76, Niagara Falls 55

Jamesville-Dewitt 74, Cathedral Prep 61

Consolation: Cathedral Prep 65, Niagara Falls 60

Championship: Milton 93, Jamesville-Dewitt 52

In one of the most dominating displays in Classic history, ESPN #17 Milton won their two games by a combined 62 points. The Eagles were led by Auburn commit Shaq Johnson who scored a team-high 36 points on a number of thunderous dunks. Despite falling to Jamesville-Dewitt in the opening round, the host Ramblers earned their first Classic game win since 2007, topping Niagara Falls by five in the consolation.

2013

Champions: Imhotep Charter, Philadelphia, PA

Imhotep Charter 74, Cathedral Prep 47

Lower Merion 56, Bishop O'Connell 52

Consolation: Cathedral Prep 80, Bishop O'Connell 75

Championship: Imhotep Charter 64, Lower Merion 61

In a Pennsylvania-dominated Classic, Imhotep Charter outlasted Lower Merion in an all-Philly final. Balanced scoring and toughness inside helped Imhotep throughout a physical tournament. The Panthers crushed host Cathedral Prep in the opening game, but the Ramblers responded in the consolation, upsetting nationally-ranked Bishop O'Connell.

2014

Champions: Archbishop Carroll, Radnor, PA

St. Rita's 61, Villa Angela-St. Joseph 59

Archbishop Carroll 47, Cathedral Prep 35

Consolation: Villa Angela-St. Joseph 64, Cathedral Prep 46

Championship: Archbishop Carroll 64, St. Rita's 38

Archbishop Carroll, the top team in Pennsylvania, finally captured a Classic title in their third appearance, grinding past the host Ramblers before dominating Chicago's St. Rita's in the final. In the consolation game, Cleveland's Villa Angela-St. Joseph took it to Prep, sending the Ramblers to their first consolation game loss since 2011.

2015

Champions: St. Edward, Lakewood, OH

St. Edward 57, Pope John XXIII (NJ) 43

Constitution (PA) 61, Cathedral Prep 56

Consolation: Pope John XXIII 68, Cathedral Prep 43

Championship: St. Edward 70, Constitution 63 (OT)

St. Edward closed out the tournament's Hammermill Center era by winning their third Classic title, defeating PA #1 Constitution 70-63 in the first overtime championship game in Classic history. The Eagles became the first team to win a Classic title in three different decades. Nationally-ranked Pope John XXIII rebounded from a tough opening game loss to take the consolation game against the host Ramblers.

2016

Champions: Neumann-Goretti, Philadelphia, PA

Neumann-Goretti 80, St. Edward 60

Toronto St. Michael's 61, Cathedral Prep 58

Consolation: St. Edward 84, Cathedral Prep 35

Championship: Neumann-Goretti 80, Toronto St. Michael's 53

In the first Burger King Classic held at the Prep Events Center, Philadelphia-based Neumann-Goretti defeated defending-champion St. Edward in the opening round before topping Toronto St. Michael's to win the tournament crown. Quade Green (eventual Kentucky commit) led the way for the Saints, totaling 48 points in the two-game span. Meanwhile, the host Ramblers suffered a buzzer-beating three-point loss to Toronto St. Michael's before dropping the consolation game to St. Ed's.

2017

Champions: Paul VI, Fairfax, VA

Paul VI 72, Villa Angela-St. Joseph 59

Westerville South 82, Cathedral Prep 54

Consolation: Villa Angela-St. Joseph 60, Cathedral Prep 37

Championship: Paul VI 58, Westerville South 47

Westerville South's Kaleb Wesson set the single-game Classic record with 43 points - surpassing Tim Thomas' 41 in 1995 - in an opening-round win over the host Ramblers. In the championship game, West had 19 rebounds and finished the tournament with 34, second all-time behind Andre Kibbler's 36 in 1983. However, it was Virginia's Paul VI Panthers that ended up taking the crown, topping Wesson and the Wildcats in the title match. Cathedral Prep was blown out in both of its games.

2018

Champions: St. John's College, Washington, DC

St. John's College 80, All Hallows 58

St. Rita's 47, Cathedral Prep 46

Consolation: All Hallows 45, Cathedral Prep 42

Championship: St. John's College 50, St. Rita's 43

The D.C.-based Cadets used a second-half surge to power past the Bronx-based Gaels in the opening round before defeating the Mustangs to win the tournament crown. Navy commit Richard Njoku led St. John's with 24 points for the tournament. Prep would drop both of its games, extending the Ramblers' tournament losing streak to 10 games.

2019

Champions: Kennedy Catholic, Hermitage, PA

Kennedy Catholic 73, St. Edward 64

Plymouth-Whitemarsh 59, Cathedral Prep 47

Consolation: St. Edward 83, Cathedral Prep 79 (2OT)

Championship: Kennedy Catholic 58, Plymouth-Whitemarsh 43

In a series of dunk-filled contests, the Golden Eagles overwhelmed the Eagles before claiming the crown over the Colonials. West Virginia commit Oscar Tshiebwe led the way with 48 points and set a Burger King Classic record with 37 rebounds, surpassing Andre Kibbler's record from 1983 (36). The host Ramblers dropped their opening game against Plymouth-Whitemarsh before suffering a 12th straight loss in their tournament in double overtime in the consolation game.

2020

Champions: Imhotep Charter, Philadelphia, PA

Imhotep Charter 65, ISA Andrews Osborne 44

Cathedral Prep 54, Thurgood Marshall Academy 34

Consolation: Thurgood Marshall Academy 57, ISA Andrews Osborne 55.

Championship: Imhotep Charter 48, Cathedral Prep 43

In one of the weakest fields in Classic history, the host Ramblers began their tournament run with a victory over Thurgood Marshall, their first Classic win since 2013. However, Imhotep Charter, which defeated Andrews Osborne in the opening game, edged Prep for its second Classic crown. Notre Dame commit Elijah Taylor led the way with 27 points for the tournament.

2021

No tournament played, due to the COVID-19 pandemic. First time since 1988 that the event was canceled for the year.

2022

Champions: St. Edward, Lakewood, OH

St. Edward 71, Mathematics, Civics and Sciences Charter 42

Canisius 62, Cathedral Prep 58

Consolation: Cathedral Prep 46, Mathematics, Civics and Sciences Charter 42

Championship: St. Edward 67, Canisius 52

In their eighth overall Classic appearance, the Eagles stormed out to a strong opening night win over the Mighty Elephants before prevailing over the Crusaders. Michael Bova led the way in the championship game with 20 points, ultimately tallying 33 points between both contests. For St. Edward, they would tie New York-based Rice with their fourth tournament title and became the first school to win the Classic in four different decades. As for the host Ramblers, they dropped a tough contest to the Crusaders, yet were able to salvage a third-place finish over M. C. & S. Charter.

2023

Champions: Lincoln Park, Midland, PA

Lincoln Park 86, Canisius 78

De La Salle 43, Cathedral Prep 42

Consolation: Canisius 55, Cathedral Prep 40

Championship: Lincoln Park 61, De La Salle 48

In their Burger King Classic debut, the Lincoln Park Leopards got off to a strong start with a well-played win over the Crusaders. Pitt commit Brendan Cummings would score 33 points, which was the 12th-best single-game performance in tournament history. Fellow teammate and Division I prospect Meleek Thomas contributed with 24 points. Together, their 57 combined points became the 2nd highest by a duo in Classic history. From there, they went on to capture the crown by prevailing over the Meteors. Cummings would once again lead the way with 29 points, finishing with 62 points over both contests. Thomas helped out with 22 points, ultimately recording 46 points overall. Meanwhile, the host Ramblers lost a tight-knit contest after a potential game-winning buzzer-beating shot was unsuccessful, before they ultimately fell in the consolation game to Canisius.

2024

Champions: Neumann-Goretti, Philadelphia, PA

Lincoln Park 70, Niagara Falls 56

Neumann-Goretti 76, Cathedral Prep 64

Consolation: Niagara Falls 76, Cathedral Prep 60

Championship: Neumann-Goretti 80, Lincoln Park 67

In a tournament field composed entirely of past participating schools, the defending Burger King Classic champion Lincoln Park Leopards and the Neumann-Goretti Saints (in their first appearance since 2016) each overcame sluggish starts within their respective opening contests before they ultimately met each other in the championship match. In their opening night win over the host Ramblers, Division I prospect Khaafig Myers led the way with 30 points and eight rebounds while teammate Larenzo Jenkins greatly contributed with 23 points and 14 rebounds. The Saints would turn in a strong performance for the championship game en route to their second classic title as Jenkins led the charge with 23 points and 17 rebounds, giving him 46 points and 31 rebounds over the two-day event. Myers also helped out with 22 points, giving him 52 overall for the weekend. As for Cathedral Prep, they fell to the Saints on opening night before getting swept in their tournament by the Wolverines (who were making their first B.K. Classic appearance since 2012) in the third-place game.

2025

Champions: Archbishop Wood, Warminster Township, PA

Archbishop Wood 56, Richmond Heights 49

Cathedral Prep 54, Aliquippa 46

Consolation: Richmond Heights 67, Aliquippa 63 (OT)

Championship: Archbishop Wood 63, Cathedral Prep 62

Within a tournament field mostly consisting of first-time participants and entirely of programs that've all won state championships over the prior decade, the Warminster, Pa.-based Vikings edged the Cleveland-based and defending Ohio-state champion Spartans to kick things off as Brady MacAdams led the way with 22 points while teammate Mike Green helped out with 15 points. As for the host Ramblers, they took advantage of the defending PIAA-champion Quips' late-game foul & turnover troubles in order to pull away with their opening round win and reach the championship match for the first time since 2020. Cathedral Prep point guard Nando Mirarchi led the team with 23 points and would even set a B.K. Classic single-game record for free throws made & attempted as he went 17-for-18 at the line. In the consolation game, Richmond Heights would mount a 23-8 fourth-quarter comeback before ultimately claiming third place in overtime as Mehki Ansberry powered the Spartans with 17 points. DeErick Barber, Jr. and Denarris Winters, Jr. would both contribute with 16 points each while Joe Emory helped the team close things out on a high note with 12 points. As for the championship game, the Ramblers played Archbishop Wood tough and even held a late lead. However, the Vikings made a fourth-quarter push before MacAdams (who lead his team with another 22-point performance) sank a game-winning three-point shot in the final seconds to give them the Classic Crown. Green & Jaydn Jenkins also helped out the cause with 17 & 13 points respectively. Prep's Mirarchi led all players with 32 points, giving him 55 total points over the two-day event.

2026

Champions: Neumann-Goretti, Philadelphia, PA

Neumann-Goretti 76, St. Edward 73

Cathedral Prep 92, Thurgood Marshall Academy 75

Consolation: St. Edward 76, Thurgood Marshall Academy 39

Championship: Neumann-Goretti 107, Cathedral Prep 91

With a tournament line-up consisting entirely of past participating schools, the Philadelphia-based Saints overcame a sluggish performance in order to outlast the Eagles in the opening contest as Allassane N'Diaye led the way with 18 points. Kody Colson also contributed with 15 points, Deshawn Yates got 14 points, Ernest Stanton turned in 12 and Stephen Ashley-Wright rounded out the team's double-digit point scorers with 10. As for the host Ramblers, they comfortably defeated the Panthers within their opening contest as they reached the championship match in consecutive years for the first time since 1990 & 1991. Nando Marachi (26 points), Ahmari Horton (25 points) and Michael Thompson (23 points) each led the way with 20+-point performances. After falling to Neumann-Goretti on opening night despite leading all scorers with 27 points, Bryan Vlosich helped St. Edward reach a comfortable third-place finish with a 26-point performance and finished with 53 total points as they handily defeated Thurgood Marshall Academy. In the championship game, the Saints would set a single-game B.K. Classic record for the most points scored surpassing L.A.-based Westchester's record from 2002 (100) en route to their second tournament win in three years and tying Cathedral Prep for the second most titles with three. N'Diaye led the way with 41 points, tying Tim Thomas for second behind Westerville South's Kaleb Wesson (43) for the tournament's single-game individual scoring record. In addition to having 18 rebounds for the climactic match, he would ultimately finish with 59 total points and 26 rebounds over the two-day event. Ashley-Wright also helped out with 18 points, Yates tallied 16 points, Marquis Newton had 13 and Colson contributed with 10. Thompson would lead the Ramblers with 27 points (50 total points for the weekend), while Mirarchi scored 21 points (47 total points for the tournament).

2027

Champions: TBA

Canisius vs. ISA Cardinal Hayes, 1/8 6 p.m.

Paul VI vs. Cathedral Prep, 1/9 7:30 p.m.

Consolation: TBA

Championship: TBA

== 25th Anniversary "Best Moments" ==
In the McDonald's Classic 25th Anniversary game program, director Ron Sertz revealed his favorite memories from the history of the event.

Best Team

St. Anthony (N.J.) from Classic '89 ("eventual national champions led by Bobby Hurley, Terry DeHere and Jerry Walker")

Best Player

Chris Webber, Detroit Country Day ("best pure combination of raw talent and refined skills")

Best Coach

Marcel Arribi, Cathedral Prep ("never blessed with national talent, yet led Prep to 6 title game appearances and three titles")

Best Game

Bishop Loughlin vs. Cathedral Prep, 1991 Championship ("Prep's Jim Hamilton won the Classic in a monumental upset with a buzzer-beating 3 pointer")

Best Moment

Cathedral Prep's 1987 Title run ("in the most exciting Classic ever, Prep defeated cross-city archrival McDowell in the opener and upset national #1 Oak Hill Academy in the final 58-48")

Biggest Upset

Cathedral Prep over Oak Hill, 1987 ("no one gave Prep a chance but coach Arribi out coached Oak Hill's Steve Smith and came away with the first of his three titles")

Worst Moment

Lenny Cooke shatters a backboard, 2000 ("a pregame warm up dunk broke the backboard and delayed the title game by an hour")

Most Exciting Play

Melvin Levitt's dunk, 1994 ("Levitt elevated completed over Prep's Keith Nies' head and threw it down from 6-8 feet from the hoop")

== Participants ==
Schools from all over America have competed in the Burger King Classic. Over 33 years, 56 different schools have participated:

Burger King Classic Participants

- Cathedral Preparatory School (Erie, PA) (1983–present)
- Beaver Falls High School (Beaver Falls, PA) (1983)
- Bishop Loughlin Memorial High School (Brooklyn, NY) (1983, 1991, 1993)
- Roman Catholic High School (Philadelphia, PA) (1983)
- Williamsport High School (Williamsport, PA) (1984, 2000)
- Christ The King Regional High School (Queens, NY) (1984)
- Benedictine High School (Richmond, VA) (1984)
- Canton McKinley High School (Canton, OH) (1985)
- Hopkinsville High School (Hopkinsville, KY) (1985)
- DeMatha Catholic High School (Hyattsville, MD) (1985)
- Villa Angela-St. Joseph High School (Cleveland, OH) (1986, 1989, 1994, 2014, 2017)
- Meadville High School (Meadville, PA) (1986, 1989)
- McDowell High School (Erie, PA) (1987)
- St. Anthony's High School (Long Island, NY) (1987)
- Oak Hill Academy (Mouth of Wilson, VA) (1987–1992)
- Admiral King High School (Lorain, OH) (1989, 1997)
- St. Anthony High School (Jersey City, NJ) (1989)
- Paul Laurence Dunbar High School (Baltimore, MD) (1990, 1992)
- Detroit Country Day School (Detroit, MI) (1991, 1997)
- St. Joseph (Brookfield, CT) (1991)
- Dunbar High School (Dayton, OH) (1992)
- St. Patrick's High School (Elizabeth, NJ) (1993, 1999, 2008)
- LaSalle Academy (New York, NY) (1993, 1996, 2000, 2001)
- Middletown High School (Middletown, OH) (1993)
- Rice High School (New York, NY) (1994, 1998, 2001, 2003, 2008)
- Simon Gratz High School (Philadelphia, PA) (1995, 1998, 2001)
- Paterson Catholic High School (Paterson, NJ) (1995, 1996)
- Chester High School (Chester, PA) (1995, 2002, 2006, 2009)
- St. Frances Academy (Baltimore, MD) (1996)
- St. Edward High School (Lakewood, OH) (1997, 2007, 2008, 2011, 2015, 2016, 2019, 2022, 2026)
- Hatboro-Horsham High School (Horsham, PA) (1998)
- Archbishop Carroll High School (Washington, D.C.) (1999, 2009, 2014)
- Westchester High School (Los Angeles, CA) (1999, 2002, 2007)
- Lexington Catholic High School (Lexington, KY) (2001)
- Dunbar High School (Washington D.C.) (2002)
- McQuaid Jesuit High School (Rochester, NY) (2002)
- Georgetown Preparatory School (North Bethesda, MD) (2003)
- Edgewater High School (Orlando, FL) (2004)
- Cardinal Dougherty High School (Philadelphia, PA) (2004)
- Mount Vernon High School (Mount Vernon, NY) (2004, 2006, 2010)
- Fairley High School (Memphis, TN) (2005)
- Bishop O'Connell High School (Arlington, VA) (2005, 2013)
- Westbury Christian School (Houston, TX) (2005, 2009)
- Rufus King High School (Milwaukee, WI) (2006)
- Solon High School (Solon, OH) (2007)
- Penn Wood High School (Lansdowne, PA) (2010, 2011)
- Nichols School (Buffalo, NY) (2010)
- Charlotte Christian School (Charlotte, N.C.) (2011)
- Jamesville-Dewitt High School (Syracuse, N.Y.) (2012)
- Milton High School (Milton, GA) (2012)
- Niagara Falls High School (Niagara Falls, N.Y.) (2012, 2024)
- Lower Merion High School (Lower Merion, PA) (2013)
- Imhotep Charter (Philadelphia, PA) (2013, 2020)
- St. Rita of Cascia High School (Chicago, Illinois) (2014, 2018)
- Pope John XXIII Regional High School (Sparta, N.J.) (2015)
- Constitution High School (Philadelphia, PA) (2015)
- Saints John Neumann and Maria Goretti Catholic High School (Philadelphia, PA) (2016, 2024, 2026)
- St. Michael's College School (Toronto, Ontario, Canada) (2016)
- Paul VI Catholic High School (Fairfax, VA) (2017, 2027)
- Westerville South High School (Westerville, OH) (2017)
- All Hallows High School (Bronx, NY) (2018)
- St. John's College High School (Washington, D.C.) (2018)
- Kennedy Catholic High School (Hermitage, PA) (2019)
- Plymouth-Whitemarsh High School (Plymouth Meeting, PA) (2019)
- Thurgood Marshall Academy (Harlem, NY) (2020, 2026)
- Andrews Osborne Academy (Willoughby, OH) (2020)
- Canisius High School (Buffalo, NY) (2022, 2023, 2027)
- Mathematics, Civics and Sciences Charter School (Philadelphia, PA) (2022)
- Lincoln Park Performing Arts Charter School (Midland, PA) (2023, 2024)
- De La Salle Institute (Chicago, Illinois) (2023)
- Aliquippa Junior/Senior High School (Aliquippa, PA) (2025)
- Archbishop Wood Catholic High School (Warminster, PA) (2025)
- Richmond Heights High School (Richmond Heights, OH) (2025)
- Cardinal Hayes High School (Bronx, N.Y.) (2027)

== Classic champions ==
Titles by School

Titles	School	Years
4	Rice	1994, 1998, 2001, 2008
4	St. Edward	1997, 2007, 2015, 2022
3	Cathedral Prep	1987, 1991, 1993
3	Neumann-Goretti	2016, 2024, 2026
2	Patterson Catholic	1995, 1996
2	Penn Wood	2010, 2011
2	Imhotep Charter	2013, 2020
1	Bishop Loughlin	1983
1	Christ the King	1984
1	Hopkinsville	1985
1	Villa Angela-St. Joseph	1986
1	St. Anthony	1989
1	Oak Hill Academy	1990
1	Baltimore Dunbar	1992
1	St. Patrick	1999
1	LaSalle	2000
1	Westchester	2002
1	McQuaid Jesuit	2003
1	Edgewater	2004
1	Fairley	2005
1	Rufus King	2006
1	Chester	2009
1	Milton	2012
1	Archbishop Carroll	2014
1	Paul VI	2017
1	St. John's College	2018
1	Kennedy Catholic	2019
1	Lincoln Park	2023
1	Archbishop Wood	2025

Titles by State

Titles	State
13	Pennsylvania
7	New York
5	Ohio
4	New Jersey
2	Virginia
1	California
1	Florida
1	Georgia
1	Kentucky
1	Maryland
1	Tennessee
1	Wisconsin

Titles by District

Titles	District
1	District of Columbia

== Team win/loss ==
Listed below are the win–loss records, by winning percentage, and number of tournaments played by all Classic participants.

School	Appearances	Record (Win %)
Paterson Catholic	2	4-0 (1.000)
Penn Wood	2	4-0 (1.000)
Imhotep Charter	2	4-0 (1.000)
Neumann-Goretti	3	6-0 (1.000)
Archbishop Wood	1	2-0 (1.000)
Christ the King	1	2-0 (1.000)
Edgewater	1	2-0 (1.000)
Fairley	1	2-0 (1.000)
Hopkinsville	1	2-0 (1.000)
McQuaid Jesuit	1	2-0 (1.000)
Milton (Ga.)	1	2-0 (1.000)
Paul VI	1	2-0 (1.000)
Rufus King	1	2-0 (1.000)
St. Anthony (N.J.)	1	2-0 (1.000)
St. John's College	1	2-0 (1.000)
Kennedy Catholic	1	2-0 (1.000)
Rice	5	9-1 (.900)
Baltimore Dunbar	2	3-1 (.750)
Lincoln Park	2	3-1 (.750)
St. Edward	9	13-5 (.722)
Bishop Loughlin	3	4-2 (.667)
Oak Hill	3	4-2 (.667)
Archbishop Carroll	3	4-2 (.667)
LaSalle	4	5-3 (.625)
(Villa Angela) St. Joseph	5	6-4 (.600)
Mount Vernon	3	3-3 (.500)
St. Patrick (N.J.)	3	3-3 (.500)
Westchester	3	3-3 (.500)
Admiral King	2	2-2 (.500)
St. Rita's	2	2-2 (.500)
Williamsport	2	2-2 (.500)
Westbury Christian	2	2-2 (.500)
Canisius	2	2-2 (.500)
All Hallows	1	1-1 (.500)
Cardinal Dougherty	1	1-1 (.500)
Charlotte Christian	1	1-1 (.500)
Dayton Dunbar	1	1-1 (.500)
Dematha	1	1-1 (.500)
Georgetown Prep	1	1-1 (.500)
Hatboro-Horsham	1	1-1 (.500)
Jamesville-Dewitt	1	1-1 (.500)
Lexington Catholic	1	1-1 (.500)
Lower Merion	1	1-1 (.500)
Nichols	1	1-1 (.500)
Richmond Heights	1	1-1 (.500)
St. Anthony (N.Y.)	1	1-1 (.500)
St. Frances	1	1-1 (.500)
Constitution	1	1-1 (.500)
Pope John XXIII	1	1-1 (.500)
Westerville South	1	1-1 (.500)
Plymouth-Whitemarsh	1	1-1 (.500)
De La Salle	1	1-1 (.500)
Chester (P.A.)	4	3-5 (.375)
Simon Gratz	3	2-4 (.333)
Cathedral Prep	41	25-57 (.305)
Bishop O'Connell	2	1-3 (.250)
Detroit Country Day	2	1-3 (.250)
Meadville (P.A.)	2	1-3 (.250)
Niagara Falls	2	1-3 (.250)
Roman Catholic	2	1-3 (.250)
Thurgood Marshall Academy	2	1-3 (.250)
Aliquippa	1	0-2 (.000)
Beaver Falls	1	0-2 (.000)
Benedictine	1	0-2 (.000)
Canton McKinley	1	0-2 (.000)
McDowell (P.A.)	1	0-2 (.000)
Middletown	1	0-2 (.000)
Solon (O.H.)	1	0-2 (.000)
St. Joseph (C.T.)	1	0-2 (.000)
Washington Dunbar	1	0-2 (.000)
ISA Andrews Osborne	1	0-2 (.000)
Mathematics, Civics and Sciences Charter	1	0-2 (.000)

== Notable alumni ==
- Jerod Mustaf (1985) University of Maryland standout, drafted by New York Knicks in 1990
- Desmond Howard (1987) University of Michigan Heisman trophy winner, drafted by Washington Redskins in 1992
- Elvis Grbac (1988) University of Michigan quarterback, drafted by Kansas City Chiefs in 1993
- Terry Dehere (1989) Seton Hall University star, drafted by Los Angeles Clippers in 1993
- Bobby Hurley (1989) Duke All-American, drafted by Sacramento Kings in 1993
- Jerry Walker (1989) Seton Hall University standout, Big East Defensive Player of the Year
- Danny Hurley (1989) Seton Hall University star point guard, brother of Bobby Hurley
- Chris Webber (1991) Michigan forward, five-time NBA All-Star with Sacramento Kings
- Andre Riddick (1991) University of Kentucky role player, brief professional career in Europe
- Felipe López (1994) St. John's University then drafted by San Antonio Spurs in 1998
- Tim Thomas (1995) NCAA Freshmen of the Year at Villanova University, drafted by Brooklyn Nets in 1998
- Ron Artest (1996) St. John's forward, NBA champion with Los Angeles Lakers
- Melvin Levett (1994) University of Cincinnati standout, drafted by Detroit Pistons in 1995
- Felipe Lopez (1994) national high school player of the year, St. John's standout, 1st round NBA draft pick
- Kevin Freeman (1996) University of Connecticut co-captain, drafted by Brooklyn Nets in 2000
- Donta Bright (1992) University of Massachusetts Amherst, signed with Brooklyn Nets in 1998
- Mark Karcher (1997) Temple University standout, drafted by Greenville Groove in NBDL draft
- Keith Booth (1995) University of Maryland star, drafted by Chicago Bulls in 1997
- Lenny Cooke (2000) declared for NBA Draft out of high school in 2002, currently in CBA
- Samuel Dalembert (1999) Seton Hall University center, drafted by the Philadelphia 76ers in 2001
- Jeff McInnis (1992) UNC point guard, seven NBA teams in 11 seasons
- Andre Barrett (1998, 2001) Seton Hall University, signed with Houston Rockets
- God Shammgod (1996) Providence College star, drafted by Washington Wizards in 1997
- Ed Elisma (1993) Georgia Tech Yellow Jackets basketball stand out, drafted by Seattle SuperSonics in 1997
- Sam Clancy (1997) University of Southern California star, drafted by Philadelphia 76ers in 2002
- Kenny Satterfield (1998) University of Cincinnati impact player, drafted by Dallas Mavericks in 2001
- Hassan Adams (2002) University of Arizona standout, drafted by Brooklyn Nets in 2006
- Matt Carroll (1998) Notre Dame and NBA three-point shooting specialist
- Trevor Ariza (2002) UCLA Bruins men's basketball forward, drafted by New York Knicks
- Herve Lamizana (1999) Rutgers University star
- Chevy Troutman (2000) University of Pittsburgh big man, plays professionally in France
- Darius Washington (2004) All-American at University of Memphis, plays in Greece
- Roy Hibbert (2003) Georgetown center, Indiana Pacers All-Star
- Kyle Lowry (2004) Villanova guard, drafted by Memphis Grizzlies
- Marcus Ginyard (2005) UNC and Westchester Knicks guard
- Darrin Govens (2006) St. Joe's guard
- Dallas Lauderdale (2007) Ohio State University center
- Delvon Roe (2007–08) All-American and Michigan State forward
- Kemba Walker (2008) UConn All-American, Charlotte Hornets star
- Chris Fouch (2008) Drexel University guard
- Melo Trimble (2013) Maryland guard
- Junior Etou (2013) Rutgers forward

== 25th anniversary team ==
In 2008, for the 25th anniversary of the McDonald's Classic, tournament director Ron Sertz compiled a list of the greatest players and coaches who have participated in the tournament. He chose four teams with six players (one from Cathedral Prep) and a coach on each. Selections were based on tournament performance, not future college or professional success.

First Team

Name	Team
Coach Marcel Arribi	Cathedral Prep
Bobby Hurley	St. Anthony
Chris Webber	Detroit Country Day
Tim Thomas	Patterson Catholic
Filipe Lopez	Rice
Darius Washington	Edgewater High
Jim Hamilton	Cathedral Prep

Second Team

Name	Team
Coach Maurice Hicks	Rice
Shaheen Holloway	St. Patrick
Samuel Dalembert	St. Patrick
Delvon Roe	St. Edward
Anthony Cade	Oak Hill
Keith Booth	Baltimore Dunbar
Jed Ryan	Cathedral Prep

Third Team

Name	Team
Coach Eric Flannery	St. Edward
Anthony Glover	St. Patrick
Hassan Adams	Westchester
Marcus Ginyard	Bishop O'Connell
Ron Artest	LaSalle Academy
Darrin Govens	Chester
Booker Coleman	Cathedral Prep

Fourth Team

Name	Team
Coach Kevin Boyle	St. Patrick
Kyle Lowry	Cardinal Dougherty
Keith Benjamin	Mount Vernon
Roy Hibbert	Georgetown Prep
Anthony Mason Jr.	Memphis Fairely
Orlando Vega	Oak Hill
Julian Blanks	Cathedral Prep

== All-time records ==
=== Individual ===
Points, Tournament

Number	Player	Team, Year
67	Darrin Govens	Chester, 2006
66	Darius Washington	Edgewater, 2004
64	Tim Thomas	Patterson Catholic, 1995
61	Chris Webber	Detroit Country Day, 1991
60	Felipe Lopez	Manhattan Rice, 1994
59	Anthony Cade	Oak Hill, 1999
58	Richard Brown	Dayton Dunbar, 1992
57	Chevy Troutman	Williamsport, 2000
57	Orlando Vega	Oak Hill, 1987
56	Kaleb Wesson	Westerville South, 2017
55	Jed Ryan	Cathedral Prep, 1995
54	Jabarie Hinds	Mount Vernon, 2010
54	Javin Hunter	Detroit Country Day, 1997
54	Tim Thomas	Patterson Catholic, 1996
54	Jim Hamilton	Cathedral Prep, 1991
52	Seldon Jefferson	Bishop Loughlin, 1993

Points, Game

Number	Player	Game, Year
43	Kaleb Wesson	Westerville South vs. Cathedral Prep, 2017
41	Tim Thomas	Patterson Catholic vs. Simon Gratz, 1995
40	Darrin Govens	Chester vs. Cathedral Prep, 2006
40	Felipe Lopez	Manhattan Rice vs. Villa Angela St. Joseph, 1994
40	Chris Webber	Detroit Country Day vs. Bishop Loughlin, 1991
39	Jabarie Hind	Mount Vernon vs. Cathedral Prep, 2010
39	Orlando Vega	Oak Hill vs. St. Anthony, 1987
38	Darius Washington	Edgewater vs. Cardinal Dougherty, 2004
35	Liam Galla	Cathedral Prep vs. St. Edward, 2019
34	Marcus Ginyard	Bishop O'Connell vs. Cathedral Prep, 2005
34	Chevy Troutman	Williamsport vs. LaSalle, 2000
33	Preston Harris	Cathedral Prep vs. Chester, 2006
32	Nando Mirarchi	Cathedral Prep vs. Archbishop Wood, 2025
32	Melvin Levett	Villa Angela St. Joseph vs. Cathedral Prep, 1994
32	Anthony Cade	Oak Hill vs. Meadville, 1990
31	Jed Ryan	Cathedral Prep vs. Chester, 1995
31	Oscar Tshiebwe	Kennedy Catholic vs. St. Edward, 2019
30	Javin Hunter	Detroit Country Day vs. Admiral King, 1997
30	Seldon Jefferson	Bishop Loughlin vs. Middletown, 1993
30	Richard Brown	Dayton Dunbar vs. Cathedral Prep, 1992

Points 2 Players, Game

Number	Players	Game, Year
58	Orlando Vega (39) and Alex Blackwell (19)	Oak Hill vs. St. Anthony, 1987

Rebounds, Game

Number	Player	Game, Year
23	Treg Lee	St. Joseph's vs. Roman Catholic, 1986
21	Tim Thomas	Paterson Catholic vs. Simon Gratz, 1995
21	Oscar Tshiebwe	Kennedy Catholic vs. St. Edward, 2019
19	Jeremy Rodriguez	Pope John XXIII vs. Cathedral Prep, 2015
19	Kaleb Wesson	Westerville South vs. Paul VI, 2017
18	Andre Kibbler	Bishop Loughlin vs. Beaver Falls, 1983
18	Andre Kibbler	Bishop Loughlin vs. Cathedral Prep, 1983

Rebounds, Tournament

Number	Player	Team, Year
37	Oscar Tshiebwe	Kennedy Catholic, 2019
36	Andre Kibbler	Bishop Loughlin, 1983
34	Kaleb Wesson	Westerville South, 2017
33	Treg Lee	St. Joseph's, 1986
33	Tarone Thornton	Roman Catholic, 1983
30	Chevy Troutman	Williamsport, 2000
30	Jerrod Mustaf	DeMatha, 1985

Field Goals Made, Game

Number	Player	Game, Year
18	Orlando Vega	Oak Hill vs. St. Anthony, 1987
17	Tim Thomas	Paterson Catholic vs. Simon Gratz, 1995

Field Goals Made, Tournament

Number	Player	Team, Year
29	Anthony Cade	Oak Hill, 1990
25	Tim Thomas	Paterson Catholic, 1995
25	Orlando Vega	Oak Hill, 1987

Field Goals Attempted, Game

Number	Player	Game, Year
33	Orlando Vega	Oak Hill vs. St. Anthony, 1987

Field Goals Attempted, Tournament

Number	Player	Team, Year
51	Tre Kelley	Washington Dunbar, 2002

Three-Point Field Goals Made, Game

Number	Player	Game, Year
9	Jabarie Hinds	Mount Vernon vs. Cathedral Prep, 2010

Three-Point Field Goals Made, Tournament

Number	Player	Team, Year
11	Jim Hamilton	Cathedral Prep, 1991

Three-Point Field Goals Attempted, Game

Number	Player	Game, Year
14	Jim Hamilton	Cathedral Prep vs. Bishop Loughlin, 1991

Three-Point Field Goals Attempted, Tournament

Number	Player	Team, Year
20	Jim Hamilton	Cathedral Prep, 1991

Free Throws Made, Game

Number	Player	Game, Year
17	Nando Mirarchi	Cathedral Prep, 2025
11	Steve Hood	DeMatha vs. Hopkinsville, 1985

Free Throws Made, Tournament

Number	Player	Team, Year
18	Darius Washington	Edgewater, 2004

Free Throws Attempted, Game

Number	Player	Game, Year
18	Nando Mirarchi	Cathedral Prep, 2025
16	Chevy Troutman	Williamsport vs. Simon Gratz, 2000
16	Steve Hood	DeMatha vs. Hopkinsville, 1985

Free Throws Attempted, Tournament

Number	Player	Team, Year
24	Chevy Troutman	Williamsport, 2000

Assists, Game

Number	Player	Game, Year
15	Charles Mann	Milton vs. Jamesville-Dewitt, 2012
13	Bobby Hurley	St. Anthony vs. St. Joseph, 1989
12	J.C. Ajemian	Benedictine vs. Christ the King, 1984
12	Terrell Stokes	Simon Gratz vs. Paterson Catholic, 1995
12	Terrell Stokes	Simon Gratz vs. Chester, 1995

Assists, Tournament

Number	Player	Team, Year
24	Terrell Stokes	Simon Gratz, 1995
19	Corey Baker	Oak Hill, 1990
19	Bobby Hurley	St. Anthony, 1989
18	Charles Mann	Milton, 2012
18	Kenneth Eusey	Manhattan Rice, 2001

Turnovers, Game

Number	Player	Game, Year
12	Matt Carroll	Hatboro-Horsham vs. Rice, 1998
11	Tommy "Rice" Moss	Georgetown Prep vs. Rice, 2003
10	Andrew MacKinnon	Nichols vs. Penn Wood, 2010

Turnovers, Tournament

Number	Player	Team, Year
18	Matt Carroll	Hatboro-Horsham, 1998
15	Tommy "Rice" Moss	Georgetown Prep, 2003

Steals, Game

Number	Player	Game, Year
9	Ashanti Cook	Westchester vs. Washington Dunbar, 2002
7	Chris Webber	Detroit County Day vs. St. Joseph, 1991

Steals, Tournament

Number	Player	Team, Year
12	Chris Webber	Detroit Country Day, 1991
11	Brandon Johnson	Edgewater, 2004
11	Ashanti Cook	Westchester, 2002
10	Seldon Jefferson	Bishop Loughlin, 1993

Blocks, Game

Number	Player	Game, Year
10	Samuel Dalembert	St. Patrick vs. Archbishop Carroll, 1999
10	Samuel Dalembert	St. Patrick vs. Westchester, 1999

Blocks, Tournament

Number	Player	Team, Year
20	Samuel Dalembert	St. Patrick, 1999
13	Sam Clancy	St. Edward, 1997

Dunks, Game

Number	Player	Team, Year
7	Shaquille Johnson	Milton vs. Niagara Falls, 2012

Dunks, Tournament

Number	Player	Team, Year
12	Shaquille Johnson	Milton, 2012

20-20 Games

Stats	Player	Team, Year
41 points, 21 rebounds	Tim Thomas	Patterson Catholic vs. Simon Gratz, 1995

Triple Double

Stats	Player	Team, Year
13 points, 16 rebounds, 10 blocks	Samuel Dalembert	St. Patrick vs. Archbishop Carroll, 1999

=== Team ===
Points, Game

Number	Team	Game, Year
107	Neumann-Goretti	vs. Cathedral Prep, 2026

Points, Tournament

Number	Team	Year
193	Westchester	2002

Rebounds, Game

Number	Team	Game, Year
58	Westchester	vs. Washington Dunbar, 2002

Rebounds, Tournament

Number	Team	Year
104	Westchester	2002

Field Goals Made, Game

Number	Team	Game, Year
39	Bishop Loughlin	vs. Beaver Falls, 1983

Field Goals Made, Tournament

Number	Team	Year
72	Westchester	2002

Field Goals Attempted, Game

Number	Team	Game, Year
82	Bishop Loughlin	vs. Beaver Falls, 1983

Field Goals Attempted, Tournament

Number	Team	Year
149	Westchester	2002

Three-Point Field Goals Made, Game

Number	Team	Game, Year
15	McQuaid Jesuit	vs. Cathedral Prep, 2003

Three Point Field Goals Made, Tournament

Number	Team	Year
26	Lexington Catholic	2001

Three-Point Field Goals Attempted, Game

Number	Team	Game, Year
36	Cathedral Prep	vs. McQuaid Jesuit, 2003

Three Point Field Goals Attempted, Tournament

Number	Team	Year
61	Cathedral Prep	2003

Free Throws Made, Game

Number	Team	Game, Year
25	St. Joseph's	vs. Cathedral Prep, 1989

Free Throws Made, Tournament

Number	Team	Year
39	Cathedral Prep	1994

Free Throws Attempted, Game

Number	Team	Game, Year
42	Cathedral Prep	vs. McDowell, 1987

Free Throws Attempted, Tournament

Number	Team	Year
67	Cathedral Prep	1987

Assists, Game

Number	Team	Game, Year
26	St. Frances	vs. Cathedral Prep, 1996

Assists, Tournament

Number	Team	Year
43	Westchester	2002

Turnovers, Game

Number	Team	Game, Year
33	Washington Dunbar	vs. Westchester, 2002

Turnovers, Tournament

Number	Team	Year
49	Cathedral Prep	1992

Fewest Turnovers, Game

Number	Team	Game, Year
3	Admiral King	vs. St. Anthony, 1989

Fewest Turnovers, Tournament

Number	Team	Year
10	LaSalle	2001

Blocks, Game

Number	Team	Game, Year
13	St. Patrick	vs. Westchester, 1999
13	St. Patrick	vs. Archbishop Carroll, 1999

Blocks, Tournament

Number	Team	Year
26	St. Patrick	1999

Steals, Game

Number	Team	Game, Year
19	Westchester	vs. Washington Dunbar, 2002

Steals, Tournament

Number	Team	Year
32	Westchester	2002

Personal Fouls, Game

Number	Team	Game, Year
27	St. Patrick	vs. Cathedral Prep, 1994
27	Dayton Dunbar	vs. Cathedral Prep, 1992
27	Cathedral Prep	vs. Dayton Dunbar, 1992

Personal Fouls, Tournament

Number	Team	Year
49	St. Patrick	1994

Combined Points, Game

Number	Game	Year
172	Cathedral Prep 88, Chester 84, OT	2006

Points, Quarter

Number	Game, Quarter	Year
39	Rice vs. Cathedral Prep, 3rd	2008

Margin of Victory, Game

Number	Game	Year
50	Westchester 100 vs. Chester 50	2002
