= Glyndon Historic District =

Historic district in Maryland, United States

- U.S. National Register of Historic Places
- U.S. Historic district
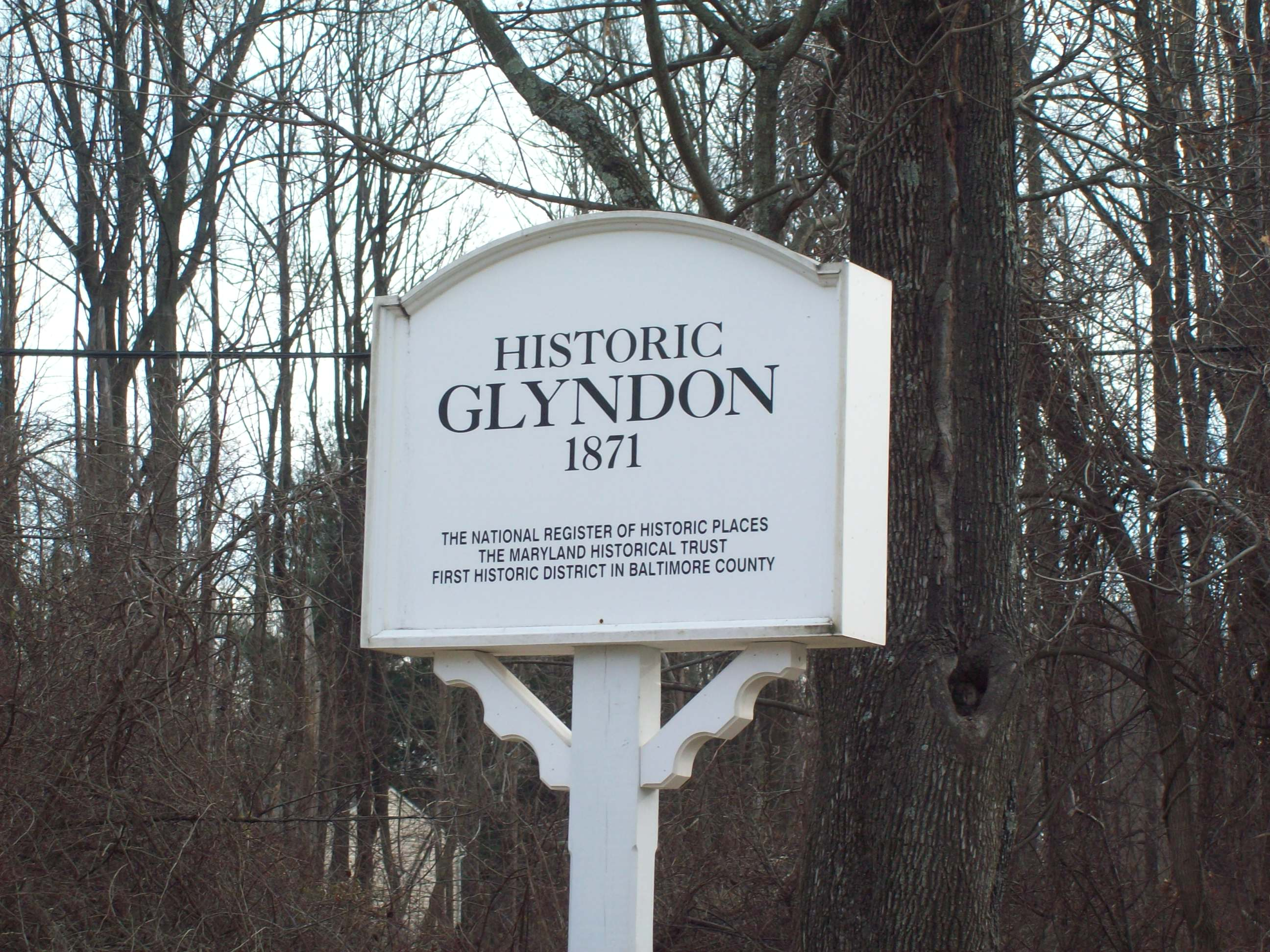
- Glyndon Historic District Sign, December 2009

- Location within Maryland Location within the United States
- Nearest city: Glyndon, Maryland
- Coordinates: 39°28′30″N 76°48′38″W
- Area: 560 acres (230 ha)
- Built: 1868
- Architect: Multiple
- Architectural style: Colonial Revival, Late Victorian
- NRHP reference No.: 73000902
- Added to NRHP: September 20, 1973

Glyndon Historic District is a national historic district in Glyndon, Baltimore County, Maryland, United States. It is a turn-of-the-20th-century community northeast of Reisterstown, Maryland, that began as a summer resort. The district is residential except for a small business district located at the intersection of Butler Road and the Western Maryland Railway tracks. The Emory Grove Campground on the northern boundary is occupied in the summer. A decided architectural homogeneity exists in Glyndon representing vernacular examples of late 19th century styles. They are typically frame, 2 1/2-story-high cottages, with one or occasionally 2-story front porches.

It was added to the National Register of Historic Places in 2006.

== Emory Grove ==
Emory Grove was founded in 1868. The Hotel, which is located at Emory Grove, was originally used by tourists and people traveling on the train. The cottages were originally tents that were later modified, in the 1900s, into 1-story wood cabins with porches. The residents at Emory Grove are devouted Christians that enjoy spending summers with their families in a quiet outdoors Christian environment. The camp ground has several historic establishments which include The Hotel, Tabernacle, and Temple. The Tabernacle is located in the center of Emory Grove. It is used for Sunday Services and Hymnals. Within the past 10 years, the members of Emory Grove have made renovations to restore both the Tabernacle and the Hotel. The Temple used to be held for bible studies and Sunday school lessons and is still used by the children. The Hotel is currently used by the residents for holiday events, celebrations, plays and special dinners. The cottages are 1-story cabins with porches. Only one cottage at Emory Grove is two stories.

== Gallery ==
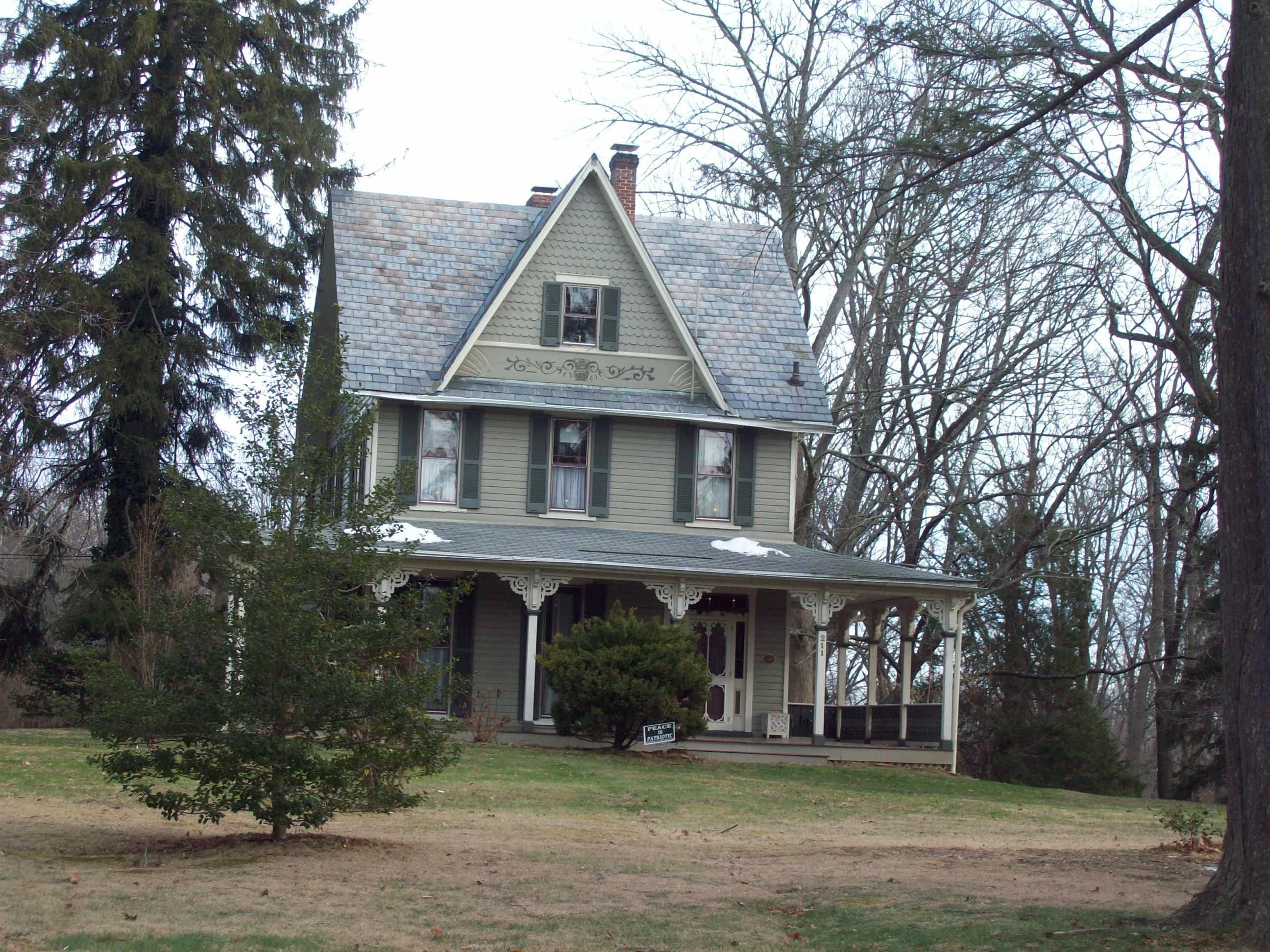
Home in Glyndon Historic District, December 2009
