= Dina Dublon =

- Born: 1953 (age 72–73); Brazil
- Education: Hebrew University of Jerusalem (BA); Carnegie Mellon University (MS)

Dina Dublon (born 1953) is a senior lecturer at Harvard Business School and current member of the boards of directors at Microsoft, Accenture, T. Rowe Price, and PepsiCo. She also serves as a trustee of Carnegie Mellon University and on the boards of several non-profit organizations, including the Global Fund for Women and the Women's Refugee Commission, where she is a co-chair. She was, from 1998 until her retirement in 2004, the executive vice president and chief financial officer for JPMorgan Chase.

Dublon was born in Brazil. She holds a bachelor's degree in economics and mathematics from the Hebrew University in Jerusalem and a master's degree from the Business School at Carnegie Mellon University. She is the recipient of many awards and honors, and was included on Fortune magazine's list of the “50 Most Powerful Women in American Business.” She has also received The International Center in New York's Award of Excellence.

In 2019, Dublon was elected as an independent director of the T.Rowe Price Group, along with Robert J. Stevens.
