= Growth investing =

Investment strategy

Growth investing is a type of investment strategy focused on capital appreciation. Those who follow this style, known as growth investors, invest in companies that exhibit signs of above-average growth, even if the share price appears expensive in terms of metrics such as price-to-earnings or price-to-book ratios. In typical usage, the term "growth investing" contrasts with the strategy known as value investing.

However, some notable investors such as Warren Buffett have stated that there is no theoretical difference between the concepts of value and growth: "the two approaches are joined at the hip: Growth is always a component in the calculation of value, constituting a variable whose importance can range from negligible to enormous and whose impact can be negative as well as positive. In addition, we think the very term 'value investing' is redundant. What is 'investing' if it is not the act of seeking value at least sufficient to justify the amount paid?" Buffett has recognized the influence of his business partner Charlie Munger on this view, which is best expressed by the famous Buffett saying: "It's far better to buy a wonderful company at a fair price than a fair company at a wonderful price".

Thomas Rowe Price, Jr. has been called "the father of growth investing" because of his work defining and promoting growth investing through his company T. Rowe Price, which he founded in 1937 and is now a publicly traded multinational investment firm.

Also influential in shaping this investment style was Phil Fisher, whose 1958 book Common Stocks and Uncommon Profits is still today a reference for identifying growth companies.

== Distinguishing growth from value investing ==
In contrast to value investing, growth investing is when the investor chooses a company that has yet to reach its full potential to invest in. This type of investing requires the investor to do a lot of research to find companies that have the potential to grow rapidly and compete with other, often larger companies within its given field. Instead of investing in an already established company, the investor takes a higher risk in hopes that the company grows and makes them money.

Growth companies are companies that have the potential to grow at a rate that is higher than the market average. Larger companies typically pay dividends to their stockholders, but growth companies will often reinvest their earnings in effort to grow the company. These companies are becoming more popular to invest in because they show great potential. This potential typically roots from the company offering a unique or advanced product that is ahead of their competitor’s products.

== Growth at reasonable price ==
"Growth at a reasonable price" is a strategy that blends aspects of growth and value investing. Investors seeking growth at a reasonable price look for stocks that they believe will deliver above-average growth, but that are not too expensive.

After the bursting of the dotcom bubble, "growth at any price" has fallen from favor. Attaching a high price to a security in the hope of high growth may be risky, since if the growth rate fails to live up to expectations, the price of the security can plummet. It is often more fashionable now to seek out stocks with high growth rates that are trading at reasonable valuations.

== Growth investment vehicles ==
There are many ways to execute a growth investment strategy. Some of these include:

- Emerging markets
- Recovery shares
- Blue chips
- Internet and technology stocks
- Smaller companies
- Special situations

== See also ==
- Value investing
- Quality investing
- Growth stock
  - PEG ratio
  - PVGO
- Magic formula investing
- Philip Arthur Fisher and Kenneth L. Fisher
- David Dodd
- Warren Buffett
