= Todd Combs =

Investment manager at Berkshire Hathaway

- Born: Todd Anthony Combs; January 27, 1971 (age 55); Sarasota, Florida, U.S.
- Education: Florida State University (BS); Columbia University (MBA)

Todd Anthony Combs (born January 27, 1971) is a former hedge fund manager and former investment manager at Berkshire Hathaway, who was also previously the chief executive officer (CEO) of GEICO from January 2020 to December 2025. Alongside Ted Weschler, he was frequently cited as a potential successor of Warren Buffett as the chief investment officer of Berkshire. In 2016, he was appointed board member of JPMorgan Chase. As of January 2026, he is the head of JPMorgan Chase's Strategic Investment Group.

== Early life and education ==
Todd Anthony Combs was born and raised in Sarasota, Florida attending Riverview High School. He is a 1993 graduate of Florida State University, with degrees in finance and multinational business operations. Combs later attended Columbia Business School in New York City, graduating in 2002.

== Career ==
After graduating college, Combs became a financial analyst for the State of Florida Banking, Securities and Finance Division. From 1996 to 2000 he was a pricing analyst at Progressive Insurance and from 2000 to 2002 he was an insurance analyst at Keefe, Bruyette & Woods. From 2003 until 2005, Combs worked at Copper Arch Capital, a hedge fund run by Scott M. Sipprelle.

In 2005, with $35 million in seed money from Stone Point Capital, Combs formed Castle Point Capital. He was Chief Executive Officer of the Greenwich, Connecticut, based hedge fund until 2010, during which time the returns were a cumulative 34%, according to an investor. In October 2010, the Wall Street Journal reported that Buffett had tapped Combs to eventually replace him as the chief investment officer of Berkshire Hathaway.

In September 2016 Combs joined the board of U.S. bank JPMorgan Chase, an appointment that expanded Berkshire's ties in the financial services industry to the top three banks in America.

On December 23, 2019 Combs was announced as the new CEO of GEICO, a subsidiary of Berkshire. He will continue in his duties as a portfolio manager for Berkshire.

On December 8, 2025, JPMorgan Chase announced Comb's scheduled departure from Berkshire in January 2026 to head the bank's Strategic Investment Group as part of its wider Security and Resilience Initiative. In connection with the announcement, Combs stepped down from the board of JPMorgan Chase and his leadership roles at GEICO and Berkshire.
