= Ted Weschler =

Investment manager at Berkshire Hathaway

- Born: Ted Weschler; May 16, 1962 (age 64); Buffalo, New York
- Education: University of Pennsylvania (B.S.)
- Occupation: Investment manager
- Known for: Investment manager at Berkshire Hathaway
- Spouse: Sheila
- Children: 2

Ted Weschler (born May 16, 1962) is an American hedge fund manager who is the current investment manager at Berkshire Hathaway. He is frequently cited as a potential future Chief Investment Officer of Berkshire.

== Early life and education ==
Ted Weschler was born in Buffalo, New York, and spent much of his childhood in Erie, Pennsylvania. Due to his father’s position as an executive of the A&P, the family moved often, largely locating in cities throughout the Rust Belt.

He attended high school at Cathedral Preparatory School in Erie. He is a 1983 graduate of the Wharton School of Business at the University of Pennsylvania, earning his bachelor's degree in economics with concentrations in finance and accounting.

== Career ==
After graduating from Wharton, Weschler worked for six years at W. R. Grace and Company, an American chemical conglomerate. In 1989 he left Grace and for the next ten years was a partner in Quad-C Management, a private equity firm in Charlottesville, Virginia.

Weschler was the managing partner of hedge fund Peninsula Capital Advisors which he founded in 1999. Peninsula's $2 billion fund returned 1236% before it was shuttered in 2011.

=== Lunch with Buffett ===
In July 2010, at $2,626,311, Weschler was the top bidder in a Glide Memorial Church auction to win a private lunch with Warren Buffett. In 2011, Weschler won a second lunch when he upped his bid to $2,626,411. His bids were anonymous until publicly announced by Fortune Magazine in September 2011.

In 2012, Weschler joined Buffett at Berkshire Hathaway, a year after Todd Combs joined as Berkshire's first investment manager. As of 2019, he managed $13 billion of the equity portfolio and $8 billion in pension funds.

=== Personal investment returns ===
According to a public statement issued by Weschler, over the course of 28 years he grew an initial Roth IRA account balance of $70,385 into $131 million. This increase implies a 31% annual return on investment. Such increases were made exclusively through the purchase of publicly available securities and are indicative of long-term market outperformance.

== Personal life ==
Weschler and his wife, Sheila, live in Charlottesville, Virginia with their two daughters. He spends part of each week in Omaha, Nebraska for his work at Berkshire Hathaway.
