= Erie BayHawks =

Erie BayHawks may refer to:

- Erie BayHawks (2008–2017), basketball team in the NBA Development League that relocated as the Lakeland Magic and are now the Osceola Magic
- Erie BayHawks (2017–2019), basketball team in the NBA G League that relocated as the College Park Skyhawks
- Erie BayHawks (2019–2021), basketball team in the NBA G League that relocated as the Birmingham Squadron
