= Hagerty Family Events Center =

Athletic center in Pennsylvania

The Hagerty Family Events Center is an indoor/outdoor muilti-purpose athletic center in Erie, Pennsylvania. Dollinger Field, the name of the football field, has an official seating capacity of 1,800. The Joann Mullen Gymnasium has a capacity of 1,800 seats, while the a 400-seat David M. Hallman III Aquatics Center boasts an aquatic complex consisting of an all-deep eight-lane short course competition pool as well as a shallow three-lane 25 yard warmup pool.

== History ==
Until 2010, Prep played all its home football and soccer games at Erie Veterans Memorial Stadium. The Events Center is on the site of the former Gunite/EMI foundry, which closed in June 2001. Prep bought 11 acres for the events center for $450,000 in September 2007. Prep used $8.8 million in financing from three area banks to help build the center. The school was able to establish the first phase debt free and is currently working to build a 2nd phase basketball facility followed by a third phase pool facility with seating.

In its inaugural game on September 10, 2010, the Cathedral Prep Ramblers defeated the Central Tech Falcons 55–9. Prior to the game, the field was named after Msgr. John Dollinger who served as a Headmaster at Cathedral Prep from 1972 to 1984.

The gym and swimming facility at the complex are named the Joann Mullen Gymnasium, and the David M. Hallman III Aquatics Center. Mullen was a longtime math teacher and the first female assistant principal and principal at Prep. She died in 2012 at the age of 72. Hallman was a swimming standout at Prep and a 2010 graduate. He died in 2014 at age 21.

In 2018, the facility was renamed the Hagerty Family Events Center after the school's director of strategic initiatives Chris Hagerty and his family.
