= History of Notre Dame Fighting Irish football =

The history of the Notre Dame Fighting Irish football team begins in 1887, when the University of Notre Dame fielded its first football team for a game against the Michigan Wolverines. The first football coach, James L. Morrison, started in 1894. Until 1913, the team played in a mix of intercollegiate games and games against local high schools.

One of the most famous coaches was Knute Rockne (coached 1918-1930). Under Rockne, the Irish would post a record of 105 wins, 12 losses, and five ties, and have 5 undefeated and untied seasons. After Rockne's death in 1931, he was replaced by assistant coach and former player Hunk Anderson, who resigned in 1933. He was replaced by another former Rockne player, Elmer Layden, who was able to convince the Michigan Wolverines team to resume playing after they'd stopped in 1909. That game would take place under the coaching of Frank Leahy, yet another Rockne alum and one of the winningest coaches in college football history.

After Leahy's departure due to health issues in 1954, the team faced a downward slope under Terry Brennan, partly due to cuts in football scholarships that made recruitment difficult. The 1956 season included only 2 wins, one of the worst in team's history. The next coach, Joe Kuharich, was the only coach to have a losing record at Notre Dame. Kuharich's replacement was Ara Parseghian, who brought the team back to success, with a winning percentage of .836 and a cover story in Time magazine. Under Parseighan, Cliff Brown became the first African-American quarterback to start a game for Notre Dame. Parseighan was replaced by Dan Devine, who changed the team's jerseys from navy blue & white to kelly green & gold in October 1977. Despite winning a national championship in 1977, he lacked the popular appeal of his predecessor. His successor, Gerry Faust, also struggled, and resigned in 1985 to avoid firing.

Lou Holtz, who coached from 1986 to 1996, was notable for his option offense, recruiting many future NFL players, and coaching the team's most recent undefeated season and national championship in 1988. He was replaced by his defensive coordinator, Bob Davie, in 1997. In 1999, Notre Dame was placed on probation by the NCAA for two years based on two scandals connected to the football team. The scandals and mediocre on-field results led to Davie's dismissal in 2001. He was briefly replaced by George O'Leary, but quickly resigned after misrepresentations were found in his resume. He was replaced by Notre Dame's first African American head coach, Tyrone Willingham. Willingham's first season started with an 8–0 record, but the team faltered over the following two seasons, with weak recruitment particularly in 2004.

Charlie Weis, a Norte Dame alum, became the thirtieth football coach in 2005. The 2007 season (3–9) included various negative milestones: the most losses in a single year (9); two of the ten worst losses ever (38–0 losses to both Michigan and USC); and the first 6-game losing streak for home games. Weis was eventually fired in 2009 and was replaced by Brian Kelly. On November 18, 2012, Notre Dame was ranked No. 1 in the nation in both the AP and Coaches' polls after reaching 11–0 during the regular season for the first time since 1993, also ranking No. 1 in the BCS standings for the first time in the 14-year history of the selection system.

In response to the COVID-19 pandemic and the cancellation of regular season scheduled games, Notre Dame joined the Atlantic Coast Conference (ACC) in football for a single season and played a full slate of conference matches. They finished the season with a seven-game winning street. Kelly left the Irish in 2021 as the program's all-time winningest head coach, and was replaced by the defensive coordinator, Marcus Freeman.

== Overview ==
=== Early history (1887–1917) ===
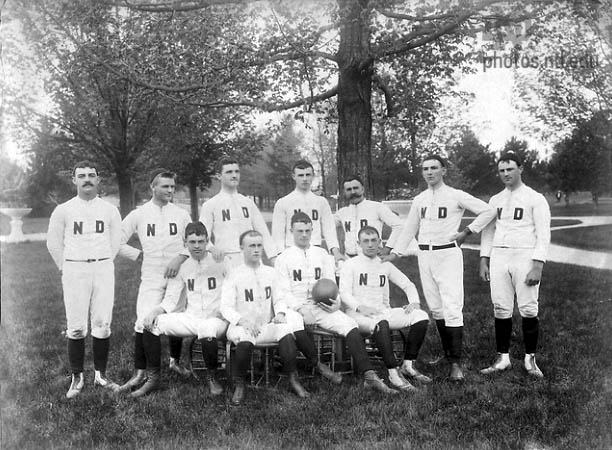
The first team fielded by the University in 1887

Football did not have an auspicious beginning at the University of Notre Dame. In their inaugural game on November 23, 1887, the Irish lost to Michigan by a score of 8–0. Their first win came in the final game of the 1888 season when the Irish defeated Harvard Prep School of Chicago by a score of 20–0. At the end of the 1888 season they had a record of 1–3 with all three losses being at the hands of Michigan by a combined score of 43–9. Between 1887 and 1899 Notre Dame compiled a record of 31 wins, 15 losses, and four ties against a diverse variety of opponents ranging from local high school teams to other universities. In 1894, James L. Morison was hired as Notre Dame's first head football coach. Notre Dame took a significant step toward respectability, prominence, and stability when they hired Morison. He wrote an acquaintance after his first day on the job: "I arrived here [Notre Dame] this morning and found about as green a set of football players that ever donned a uniform... They want to smoke, and when I told them that they would have to run and get up some wind, they thought I was rubbing it in on them. "One big, strong cuss remarked that it was too much like work. Well, maybe you think I didn't give him hell! I bet you a hundred no one ever makes a remark like that again." Morrison had been hired for $40 plus expenses for two weeks.

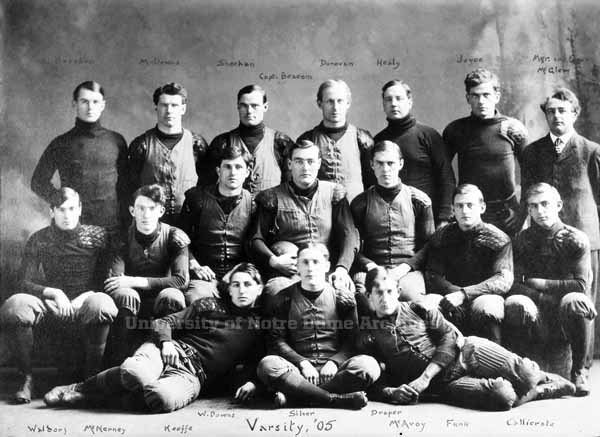
Notre Dame team of 1905

In 1908, the win over Franklin saw end Fay Wood catch the first touchdown pass in Notre Dame history. Notre Dame continued its success near the turn of the century and achieved their first victory over Michigan in 1909 by the score of 11–3 after which Michigan refused to play Notre Dame again for 33 years. By the end of the 1912 season they had amassed a record of 108 wins, 31 losses, and 13 ties. Jesse Harper became head coach in 1913 and remained so until he retired in 1917. During his tenure the Irish began playing only intercollegiate games and posted a record of 34 wins, five losses, and one tie. This period would also mark the beginning of the rivalry with Army and the continuation of rivalry with Michigan State. In 1913, Notre Dame burst into the national consciousness and helped to transform the collegiate game in a single contest. In an effort to gain respect for a regionally successful but small-time Midwestern football program, Harper scheduled games in his first season with national powerhouses Texas, Penn State, and Army.

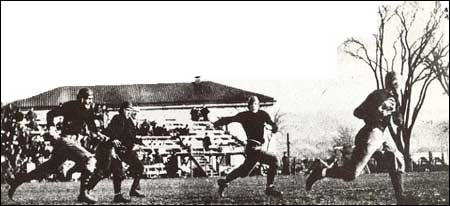
Knute Rockne running for a touchdown against Army after receiving a forward pass, November 1, 1913

On November 1, 1913, the Notre Dame squad stunned the Black Knights of the Hudson 35–13 in a game played at West Point. Led by quarterback Gus Dorais and end Knute Rockne—who was soon to be legendary coach—the Notre Dame team attacked the Cadets with an offense that featured both the expected powerful running game but also long and accurate downfield forward passes from Dorais to Rockne. This game has been miscredited as the invention of the forward pass. Prior to this contest, receivers would come to a full-stop and wait on the ball to come to them, but in this contest, Dorais threw to Rockne in stride, changing the forward pass from a seldom-used play into the dominant ball-moving strategy that it is today.

=== Knute Rockne era (1918–1930) ===
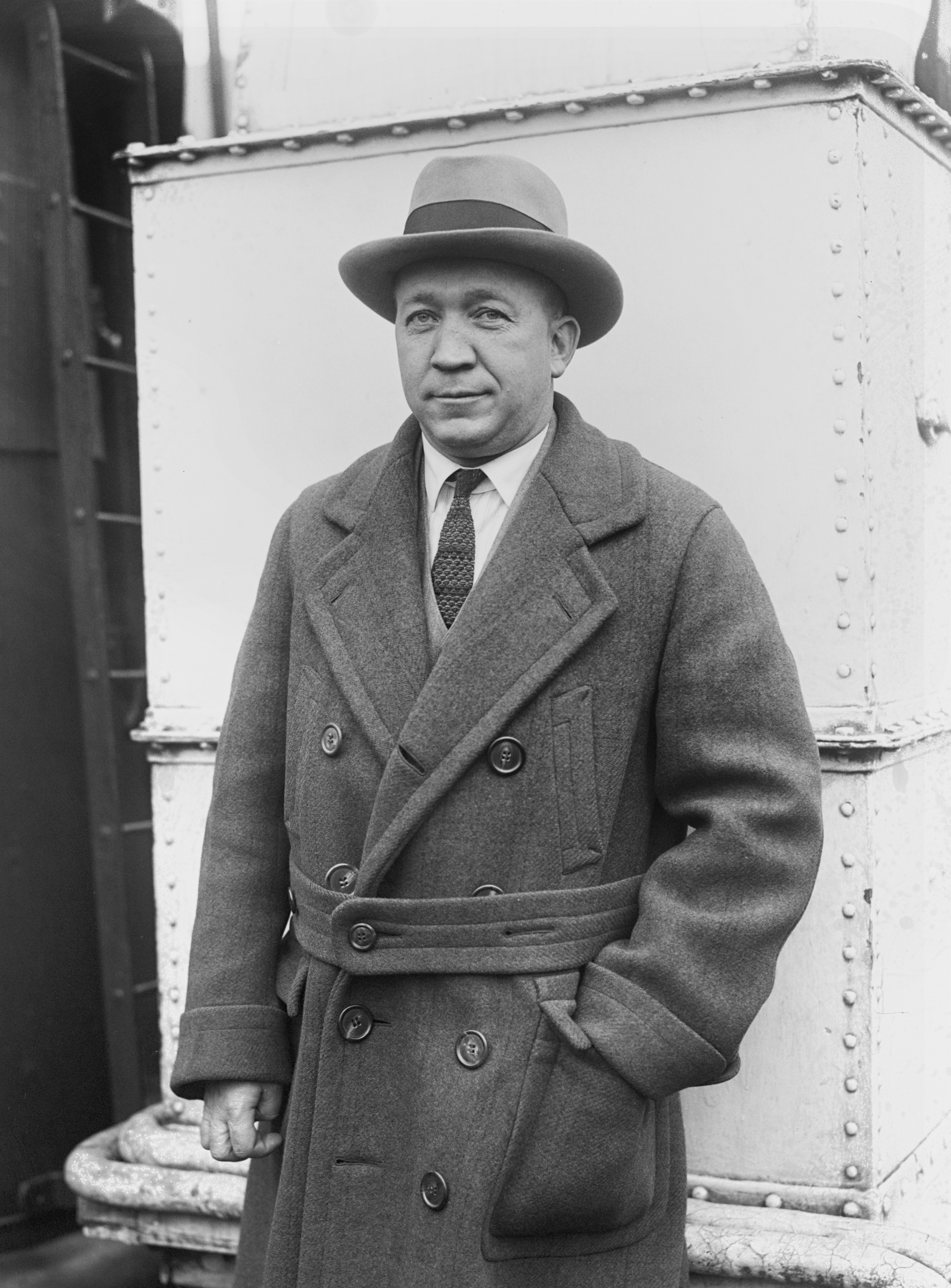
Coach Knute Rockne

Irish assistant Knute Rockne became head coach in 1918. Under Rockne, the Irish would post a record of 105 wins, 12 losses, and five ties. The 105 wins account for 12.3% of all wins in Notre Dame football history. During his 13 years, the Irish won three national championships, had five undefeated seasons, won the Rose Bowl in 1925, and produced players such as George Gipp and the "Four Horsemen". Knute Rockne has the highest winning percentage (.881) in NCAA Division I/FBS football history. Rockne's offenses employed the Notre Dame Box and his defenses ran a 7–2–2 scheme.

Rockne took over in the war-torn season of 1918 and posted a 3–1–2 record; he lost only to the Michigan Agricultural Aggies. He made his coaching debut on September 28, 1918, against Case Tech in Cleveland, Ohio and earned a 26–6 victory. Leonard Bahan, George Gipp, and Curly Lambeau were in the backfield. With Gipp, Rockne had an ideal handler of the forward pass. The 1919 team had Rockne handle the line and Gus Dorais handle the backfield. The team went undefeated and won the national championship.

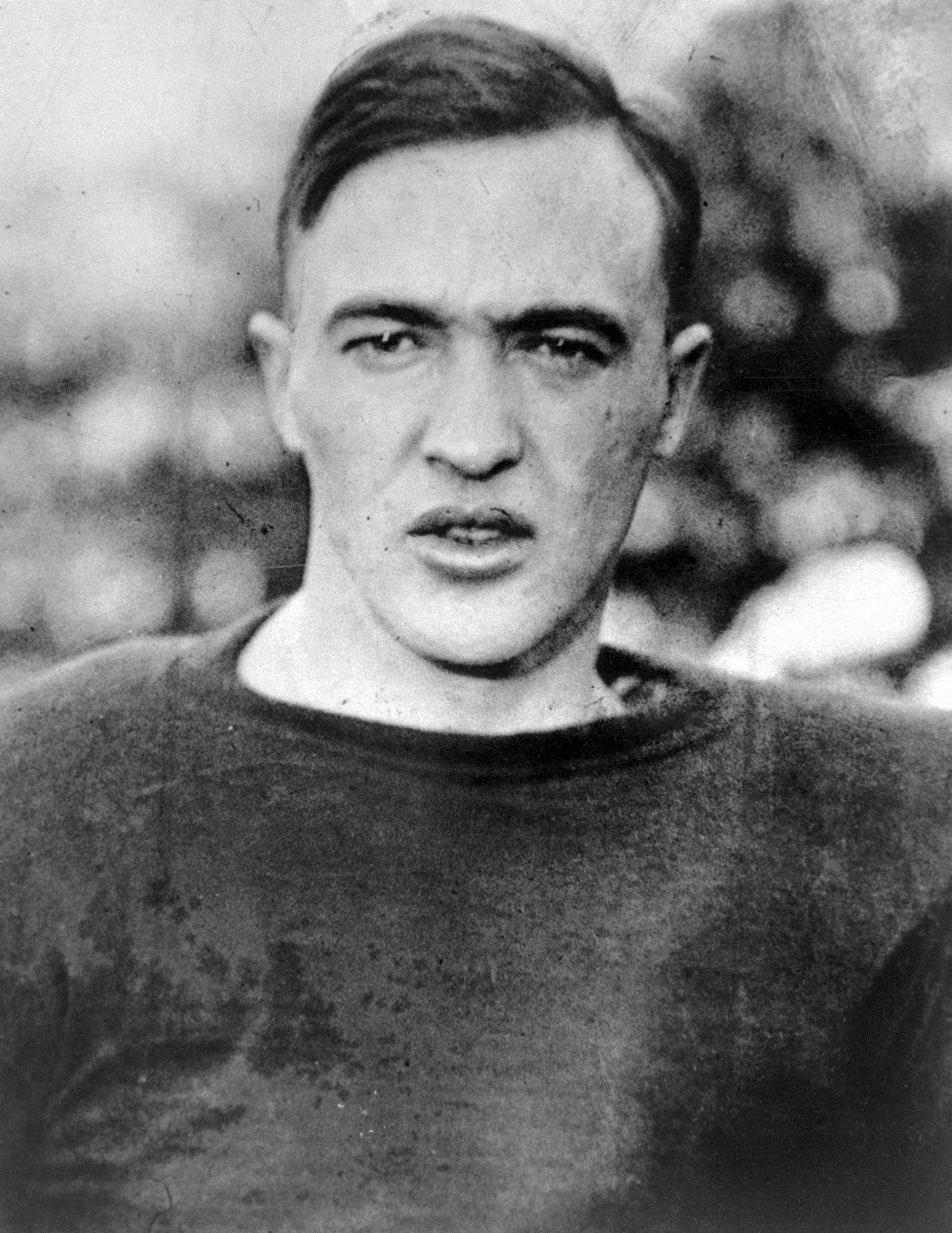
George Gipp, "The Gipper"

Gipp died at age 25 on December 14, 1920, just two weeks after Walter Camp elected him as Notre Dame's first All-American. Gipp likely contracted strep throat and pneumonia while giving punting lessons after his final game on November 20 against Northwestern. Since antibiotics were not available in the 1920s, treatment options for such infections were limited and they could be fatal even to young, healthy individuals. Rockne was speaking to Gipper on his hospital bed when he was purported to have delivered the famous, "Win one for the Gipper" line.

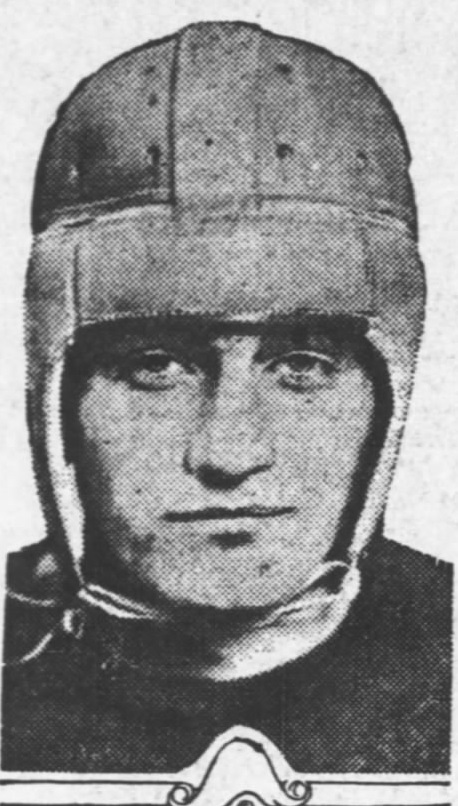
Roger Kiley

John Mohardt led the 1921 Notre Dame team to a 10–1 record with 781 rushing yards, 995 passing yards, 12 rushing touchdowns, and nine passing touchdowns. Grantland Rice wrote that "Mohardt could throw the ball to within a foot or two of any given space" and noted that the 1921 Notre Dame team "was the first team we know of to build its attack around a forward passing game, rather than use a forward passing game as a mere aid to the running game." Mohardt had both Eddie Anderson and Roger Kiley at end to receive his passes.

The national champion 1924 team included the "Four Horsemen" backfield of Harry Stuhldreher, Don Miller, Jim Crowley, and Elmer Layden. The line was known as the "Seven Mules". The Irish capped an undefeated, 10–0 season with a victory over Stanford in the Rose Bowl. The 1926 team beat Army and was led by Christie Flanagan. For all his success, Rockne also made what an Associated Press writer called "one of the greatest coaching blunders in history." Instead of coaching his team against Carnegie Tech, Rockne traveled to Chicago for the Army–Navy Game to "write newspaper articles about it, as well as select an All-America football team." Carnegie Tech used the coach's absence as motivation for a 19–0 win; the upset likely cost the Irish a chance for a national title.

The 1928 team lost to national champion Georgia Tech. "I sat at Grant Field and saw a magnificent Notre Dame team suddenly recoil before the furious pounding of one man–Peter Pund," said Rockne. "Nobody could stop him. I counted 20 scoring plays that this man ruined." Among the events that occurred during Rockne's tenure none may be more famous than the Rockne's Win one for the Gipper speech. Army came into the 1928 matchup undefeated and was the clear favorite. Notre Dame, on the other hand, was having their worst season under Rockne's leadership and entered the game with a 4–2 record. At the end of the half Army was leading and looked to be in command of the game. Rockne entered the locker room and gave his account of Gipp's final words: "I've got to go, Rock. It's all right. I'm not afraid. Some time, Rock, when the team is up against it, when things are going wrong and the breaks are beating the boys, tell them to go in there with all they've got and win just one for the Gipper. I don't know where I'll be then, Rock. But I'll know about it, and I'll be happy." The speech inspired the team and they went on to upset Army and win the game 12–6. The 1929 and 1930 teams both went undefeated, winning national championships, and the 1930 team was led by the likes of Frank Carideo, Joe Savoldi, Marchy Schwartz and Marty Brill. It featured the first and only example of all four members of a backfield being named to an All-American team during the same season. The 1929 team played all of its games on the road while the new Notre Dame Stadium was being built. In 1930, "Jumping Joe" Savoldi scored the first Notre Dame touchdown in the new stadium on a 98-yard kickoff return. Savoldi is also known as "the first hero in the lore of Notre Dame's Stadium" based on scoring three touchdowns in the official stadium dedication game against Navy the following week. Rockne coached his last game on December 14, 1930, when he led a group of Notre Dame all-stars against the New York Giants in New York City. The game raised funds for the Mayor's Relief Committee for the unemployed and needy of the city. 50,000 fans turned out to see the reunited "Four Horsemen" along with players from Rockne's other championship teams take the field against the pros.

On March 31, 1931, Rockne died at age 43 in the crash of a Transcontinental & Western Air airliner in Kansas; he was on his way to help in the production of the film The Spirit of Notre Dame. The crash site is located in a remote expanse of Kansas known as the Flint Hills and now features a Rockne Memorial. As Notre Dame's head coach from 1918 to 1930, Rockne posted what has remained for decades the all-time highest winning percentage (.881) for a football coach in the NCAA's flagship FBS division. During his 13-year tenure as head coach of the Fighting Irish, Rockne collected 105 victories, 12 losses, 5 ties and 3 national championships. Rockne also coached Notre Dame to 5 undefeated and untied seasons.

=== Heartley Anderson (1931–1933) ===
Through game broadcasts during the Golden Age of Radio, Notre Dame football gained a nationwide following of "subway alumni", Catholics who became fans whether or not they attended the university. Former Saint Louis head coach Heartley "Hunk" Anderson was promoted from assistant coach and took the helm of the Irish after Knute Rockne's death, leading them to a record of 16 wins, nine losses, and two ties. Anderson was a former Irish player under Rockne and was serving as an assistant coach at the time of Rockne's death. Anderson resigned as Irish head coach after the 1933 season to accept the position of head football coach at NC State. Notre Dame finished 6–2–1 in 1931. The Irish began the season with a 25–0 win over Indiana, Notre Dame tied Northwestern in the season's second game. Anderson's squad then demolished Drake by a score of 63–0. After defeating Pittsburgh by a score of 25–12, the Fighting Irish shut out their next three opponents; Carnegie Mellon, Pennsylvania and Navy. The Irish lost a heartbreaker by a score of 16–14 to USC on November 21 that snapped the Irish's 26-game non-losing streak. Army shut out the Irish by a score of 12–0 on November 28 to finish the Irish's season. The Irish went 7–2 in 1932. Anderson's team began with three blowout victories; 73–0 over Haskell, 62–0 over Drake and 42–0 over Carnegie Mellon. The Irish then faced Pittsburgh in front of a then-record crowd of 62,000, losing by a score of 12–0. Notre Dame bounced back to win its next four; 24–6 over Kansas, 21–0 over Northwestern, 12–0 over Navy and 21–0 over Army in front of a new record crowd on 80,000. Anderson's Irish closed the season on a sour note, losing to USC by a score of 13–0. 1933 was a tough year for the Irish as they finished with a 3–5–2 record. Notre Dame began the season in a scoreless tie with Kansas. After defeating Indiana by a score of 12–2, ND suffered a four-game losing streak, failing to score a point in all four losses to Carnegie Tartan, Pittsburgh, Navy. and Purdue. Notre Dame ended the losing streak by defeating Northwestern by a score of 7–0. The Fighting Irish closed the season with a 19–0 loss to USC and a 13–12 win over Army.

=== Elmer Layden (1934–1940) ===
Anderson was replaced by Elmer Layden, who was one of Rockne's "Four Horsemen" in the 1920s. After graduating, Layden played professional football for one year and then began a coaching career. The Irish posted a record of 47 wins, 13 losses, and three ties in seven years under Layden, the most successful record of a Notre Dame coach not to win a national championship. He left Notre Dame after the 1940 season to become Commissioner of the National Football League.

Layden's 1935 squad posted one of the greatest wins in school history by rallying to defeat Ohio State by a score of 18–13. His 1938 team finished 8–1, losing only to USC in the season finale. This loss cost them a possible consensus national championship, but the team was named national champion by the Dickinson System. Like Rockne before him, Layden was a goodwill ambassador for Notre Dame during his time as head coach. He was able to schedule a home-and-home series with Michigan after meeting with Fielding H. Yost, healing a rift between the two schools. The two teams had not met since 1909, when, after eight straight losses to the Wolverines, the Irish posted their first win. They were scheduled to meet again in 1910, but Michigan canceled the game and refused to play the Irish again. By the time they met again in 1943, Layden had left Notre Dame and Frank Leahy had taken his place. Unlike the easygoing Layden, Leahy was intense, and after the Irish had thrashed Michigan by a score of 35–12 in 1943, Wolverine coach and athletic director Fritz Crisler never scheduled the Irish again.

=== Frank Leahy era (1941–1953) ===
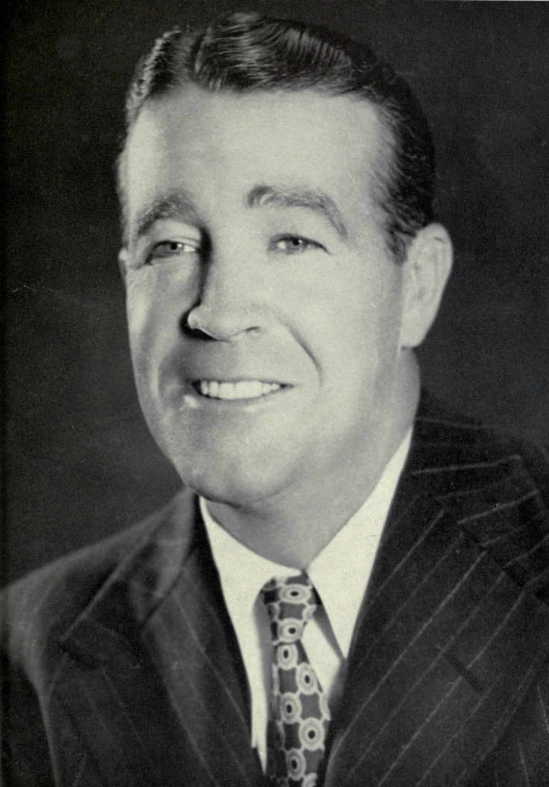
Coach Leahy

Boston College head coach Frank Leahy was hired by Notre Dame to take over for Layden in 1941, and was another former Irish player who played during the Rockne era. After graduating from Notre Dame, Leahy held several coaching positions, including line coach of the "Seven Blocks of Granite" of Fordham University that helped that team win all but two of their games between 1935 and 1937. He then coached the Boston College Eagles to a win in the 1941 Sugar Bowl and a share of the national championship. His move to Notre Dame began a new period of gridiron success for the Irish, and ensured Leahy's place among the winningest coaches in the history of college football.

Leahy coached the team for 11 seasons, from 1941 to 1943 and 1946 to 1953. He has the second highest winning percentage (.864) of any college coach in history. He led the Irish to a record of 87 wins, 11 losses, and nine ties including 39 consecutive games without a loss (37–0–2), four national championships, and six undefeated seasons. A fifth national championship was lost because of a 1953 tie against Iowa, in a game that featured 1953 Heisman Trophy winner Johnny Lattner that caused a minor scandal at the time, when it appeared that some Irish players had faked injuries to stop the clock, leading some to nickname those players the "Fainting Irish". From 1944 to 1945, Leahy served in the U.S. Navy during World War II and was honorably discharged as a captain. Edward McKeever, Leahy's assistant coach, became interim head coach when Leahy left for the Navy. During his one year at the helm (1944) the Irish managed 8 wins and 2 losses. McKeever left Notre Dame in 1945 to take over as head coach of Cornell. He was replaced by Hugh Devore for the 1945 season who led the Irish to a 7–2–1 record. Leahy retired in 1954 reportedly due to health issues. Perhaps the best example of this occurred during the Georgia Tech game in 1953. Leahy fell ill during the game, which led to him collapsing during halftime. The situation was so dire that a priest was called in to give Leahy the last rites. However, Leahy recovered, and the consequent diagnosis was that he was suffering from nervous tension and pancreatitis.

=== Terry Brennan (1954–1958) ===
The departure of Frank Leahy ushered in a downward slope in Notre Dame's performance, referred to in various circles as a period of de-emphasis. 25-year old assistant coach Terry Brennan was hired as Frank Leahy's successor as the Notre Dame head coach in 1954 and would stay until 1958. When asked if he thought he was too young to be a head coach at the age of 25, Brennan replied, "Oh, I don't know. I'll be 26 in a few months." He departed with a total of 32 wins and 18 losses. But note: the 32 wins included 17 in 1954 and 1955. From 1956 to 1958 his record was 15–15. Brennan was a former player under Leahy and before joining the Irish had coached the Mount Carmel High School team in Chicago and later the freshman squad and assistant at Notre Dame. His first two seasons the Irish were ranked fourth and ninth respectively. It was the 1956 season that began to darken his reputation, for it became one of the most dismal in the team's history and saw them finish the season with a mere two wins, including losses to Michigan State, Oklahoma, and Iowa. One bright spot in the 1956 season was the awarding of the Heisman Trophy to Paul Hornung, who would go on to a legendary NFL career with the Green Bay Packers. To date, Hornung is the only Heisman winner to win the award while playing for a team that had a losing record. The Irish would recover the following season, posting a record of 7–3 and including in their wins a stunning upset of Oklahoma, in Norman, Oklahoma, that ended the Sooners' still-standing record of 47 consecutive wins. In Brennan's final season, though, the Irish finished 6–4. Brennan was fired in mid-December. Brennan's tenure can only be properly framed with the understanding that in a time of zero scholarship limitations in college football, Notre Dame's administration inexplicably began a process of deemphasizing football, severely cutting scholarships and hindering Brennan from building a roster of any meaningful depth.

=== Joe Kuharich (1959–1963) ===
Former San Francisco, Chicago Cardinals and Washington Redskins head coach Joe Kuharich took the head coaching position at Notre Dame in 1959, realizing a longtime ambition to return to his alma mater. He had earlier been courted by Notre Dame after the 1956 season, after the Irish finished 2–8, but before he had a chance to accept an offer, Terry Brennan was given a reprieve. He brought a professional touch to Irish football, putting shamrocks on the players' helmets and shoulder stripes on their jerseys. Kuharich compiled a 17–23 record over four non-winning seasons and remains to this day the only coach ever to have an overall losing record at Notre Dame. Included was a school-record eight-game losing streak in 1960, a year in which the Irish finished 2–8. It was one of the worst stretches in program history. The consensus opinion was that Kuharich never made the adjustment from pro football to college football, attempting to use complicated pro coaching techniques with collegiate players, and never adapted to the limited substitution rules in effect at the time, having big, immobile linemen playing both ways in an era where smaller, quicker players were preferred. He often said, "You win some and you lose some", and seemed perfectly content finishing 5–5 every year. This did not sit well with the Irish faithful, who expected Notre Dame to beat everybody. When the pressure of winning became too much to bear, Kuharich resigned in the spring of 1963 and assumed the post of supervisor of NFL officials. Because it was so late in the spring, Hugh Devore was named head coach for the 1963 season while the search for a permanent replacement was being conducted. The players that he recruited came to within 93 seconds of an undefeated season and a national championship in 1964 under first-year coach Ara Parseghian. Despite his unsuccessful Notre Dame tenure, Kuharich remains the only Irish coach to post back-to-back shutouts over their greatest rival, the University of Southern California Trojans in 1960 (17–0) and 1961 (30–0).

Kuharich was involved in a game whose controversial ending resulted in a rule change still in effect today. In 1961, Notre Dame faced Syracuse at home and trailed, 15–14, with three seconds left to play. A desperation 56-yard field goal attempt fell short as time ran out, and Syracuse appeared to have won the game. But the Orangemen were penalized 15 yards for roughing the placekick holder, and given a second chance with no time showing on the clock, Notre Dame kicker Joe Perkowski drilled a 41-yard field goal for a 17–15 Irish victory. Syracuse immediately cried foul, claiming that under the existing rules, the second kick should not have been allowed because time had expired. It never was clear whether the officials had erred in allowing the extra play, and the Irish victory was permitted to stand. As a result of this game, the rule was clarified to state that a half cannot end on an accepted defensive foul—consistent with the officials' ruling in this game.

=== Ara Parseghian era (1964–1974) ===
Ara Parseghian Statue, dedicated September 22, 2007

In 1964, Ara Parseghian left his job as the Northwestern head football coach when he was hired to take over the coaching duties at Notre Dame. He immediately brought the team back to a level of success in Irish football history that was comparable only to Rockne and Leahy. These three coaches have an 80% or greater winning percentage while at Notre Dame – Rockne at .881, Leahy at .864, and Parseghian at .836. Parseghian's teams never won fewer than seven nor lost more than three games during the ten game regular seasons of the era.

In his first year, the Irish improved their record to 9–1, but they lost the national championship in the last game of the season at USC when Craig Fertig connected with a touchdown pass to Rod Sherman. Parseghian earned coach of the year honors from the American Football Coaches Association, the Football Writers Association, and The Sporting News, as well as several others, and a cover story in Time magazine. Parseghian was also named coach of the year by several selectors in his national championship years of 1966 and 1973 and was inducted into the College Football Hall of Fame in 1980. It was under Parseghian as well that Notre Dame lifted its 40-plus year-old "no bowl games" policy, beginning with the season of 1969, after which the Irish played the No. 1 Texas Longhorns in the Cotton Bowl Classic, losing in the final minutes in a closely contested game. The following year, Parseghian's 9–1 squad ended Texas' Southwest Conference record 30-game winning streak in the 1971 Cotton Bowl. During his eleven-year career, the Irish amassed a record of 95–17–4 and captured two national championships as well as the MacArthur Bowl in 1964. The Irish also had undefeated seasons in 1966 and 1973, had three major bowl wins in five appearances, and produced one Heisman Trophy winner (John Huarte in 1964). In 1971, Cliff Brown became the first African-American quarterback to start a game for the program. Due to health issues, Parseghian was forced to retire from coaching after the 1974 season.

=== Dan Devine (1975–1980) ===
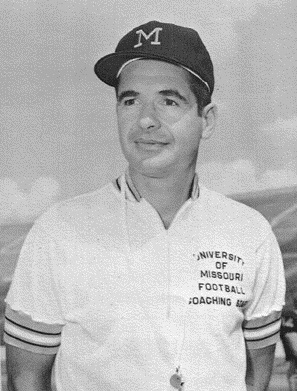
Coach Devine

Dan Devine was hired to take over as head coach upon Parseghian's retirement from Notre Dame in 1975. Devine was already a highly successful coach and had led Arizona State, Missouri, and the NFL's Green Bay Packers. Devine had been a leading candidate for the head coaching job at Notre Dame in 1964, when Ara Parseghian was hired. When approached for the job following Parseghian's resignation, Devine accepted immediately, joking that it was probably the shortest job interview in history. When he arrived at Notre Dame he already had a college coaching record of 120 wins, 40 losses, and eight ties and had led his teams to victory in four bowl games. At Notre Dame he would lead the Irish to 53 wins, 16 losses, and a tie as well as three bowl victories.

His lasting achievement came midway through this run, when Notre Dame won the 1977 national championship, led by junior quarterback Joe Montana. The championship season climaxed with a 38–10 win in the 1978 Cotton Bowl Classic over previously top-ranked Texas, led by Heisman Trophy winner Earl Campbell. The win vaulted the Irish from fifth to first in the polls. Earlier in the season, before the annual game against USC, played at home on October 22, Devine changed the team's jerseys from navy blue & white to kelly green & gold, later known as the "green jersey game" resulting in a 49–19 victory over the Trojans. The Irish continued to wear green for the rest of Devine's tenure at the school. Like Joe Kuharich before him, Devine was involved in a game while at Notre Dame whose ending resulted in a rule change still in effect today. On September 15, 1979, the Irish faced the Michigan Wolverines in Ann Arbor in their season opener. With six seconds remaining, Michigan lined up for a game-winning field goal attempt. Notre Dame linebacker Bob Crable ran onto the backs of offensive lineman Tim Foley and defensive end Scott Zettek and was able to block the kick, preserving a 12–10 Irish victory. A new rule was implemented the following season that prohibited this tactic.

Because he had the unenviable task of following a legend, Devine came under heavy scrutiny while at Notre Dame and it was felt that he was never fully embraced by the Notre Dame community, despite winning a national championship. After a 5–2 start in his first season, rumors of incompetence were circulated and that Devine would be dismissed and replaced by Don Shula or even Ara Parseghian (who went so far as to say he would not return to Notre Dame under any circumstances). Even on the day of the 1977 USC game, "Dump Devine" bumper stickers were being sold outside Notre Dame Stadium. He also had the notoriety of losing to his old program, a shocking 3–0 loss to the Tigers at South Bend in 1978. On August 15, 1980, Devine announced that he would be leaving Notre Dame at the end of season, saying he wanted to be able to spend more time with his wife. He moved back to Arizona and became a fundraiser for Arizona State University's Sun Devil Foundation. In 1985, he was elected to the College Football Hall of Fame, and then returned to his old school at Missouri seven years later as athletic director to help navigate the school through financial troubles. Devine was inducted into the inaugural class of the University of Minnesota Duluth Athletic Hall of Fame in 1991.

=== Gerry Faust (1981–1985) ===
Gerry Faust was a surprise choice when hired to replace Devine in 1981. Prior to Notre Dame, Faust had been one of the more successful high school football coaches in the country. As coach of Moeller High School in Cincinnati he amassed a 174–17–2 record over 19 seasons. Many of his players had gone on to play for Notre Dame; indeed, when he arrived in South Bend, he was reunited with nine of his former players from Moeller. Despite his success in the high school ranks, Faust's success at Notre Dame was mixed and his record mediocre at best. In his first season, the Irish finished 5–6. In Faust's second season, Notre Dame improved slightly to 6–4–1. The most successful years under Faust were the 1983 and 1984 campaigns where the Irish finished 7–5 and made trips to the Liberty Bowl and Aloha Bowl respectively. His final record at Notre Dame was 30–26–1. To avoid being fired, Faust resigned at the end of the 1985 season, following fan cries of "Oust Faust". He announced his resignation prior to the final game of the year, where Notre Dame suffered a humiliating 58–7 loss at Miami; Allen Pinkett scored the Irish TD. Faust proceeded to take over as head coach at Akron.

=== Lou Holtz era (1986–1996) ===
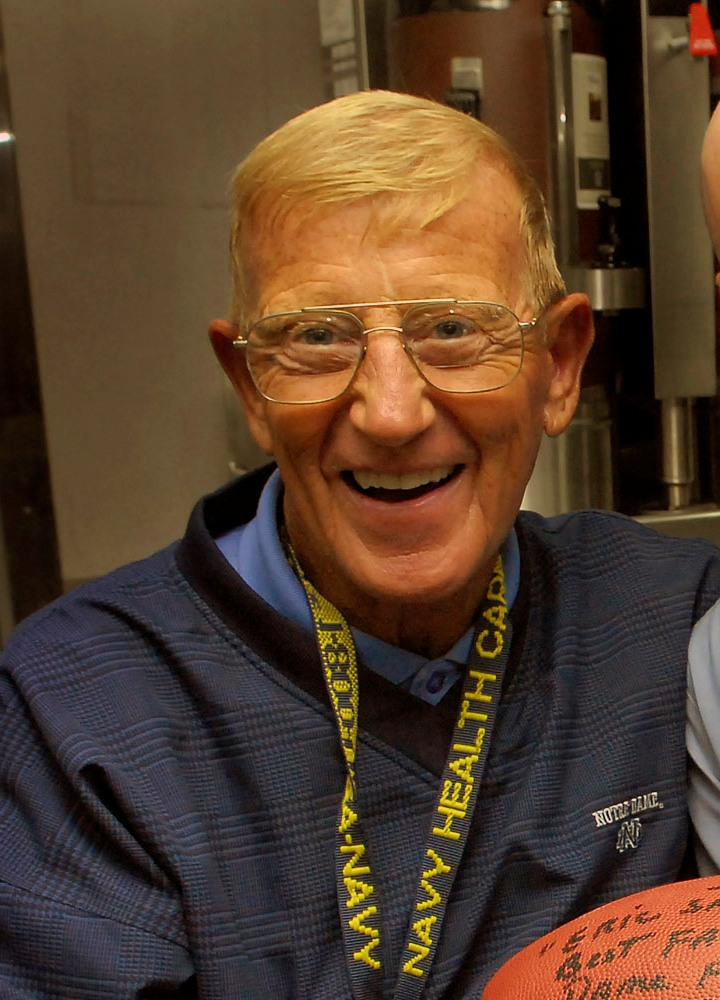
Coach Holtz

Lou Holtz had 17 years of head coaching experience by the time he was hired to lead the Irish. He had previously been head coach of William & Mary, North Carolina State, the NFL's New York Jets, Arkansas, and Minnesota. Holtz began in 1986 where his predecessor left off in 1985, finishing with an identical record of 5 wins and 6 losses. However, unlike the 1985 squad, which was generally outcoached and outplayed, Holtz's 1986 edition was competitive in nearly every game, losing five out of those six games by a combined total of 14 points. That would be his only losing season as he posted a record of 95–24–2 over the next ten seasons adding up to a 100–30–2 record overall.

In 1987, Holtz led the Irish to an 8–4 record. Notre Dame's best player was star wide receiver Tim Brown, who would win the Heisman Trophy that season and is Notre Dame's seventh and last Heisman winner to date. The season began with the Irish defeating #9 Michigan in Ann Arbor, Michigan by a score of 26–7. The next week, the Irish defeated #17 Michigan State by a score of 31–8. After defeating Purdue, the Irish lost to Pittsburgh and lost starting quarterback Terry Andrysiak to injury during the game. With sophomore quarterback Tony Rice under center, the Irish reeled off five straight wins, beginning with Air Force, then USC, Navy, Boston College and #10 Alabama. Notre Dame would then lose their last three to close the season, starting with Penn State, then #2 Miami and Texas A&M in the Cotton Bowl.

In contrast to Faust, Holtz was well known as a master motivator and a strict disciplinarian. The tone was set with Holtz's first meeting with his team as Irish head coach in 1986, immediately demanding his players sit up straight in their chairs and look him in the eye as he spoke. He displayed the latter trait in spades when two of his top contributing players showed up late for dinner right before the then top-ranked Irish played second-ranked USC in the final regular season game of 1988. In a controversial move, coach Lou Holtz took his 10–0 Irish squad to Los Angeles without stars Ricky Watters and Tony Brooks, who he suspended for disciplinary reasons. This was not the first time these players had gotten into trouble and the players had been warned there would be serious consequences if it happened again. His move was vindicated when the Irish defeated USC anyway. Holtz was named national coach of the year (Paul "Bear" Bryant Award) in 1988, the same season he took Notre Dame to an upset of No. 1 Miami in the Catholics vs. Convicts series and a win over No. 3 West Virginia in the Fiesta Bowl, thus capturing the national championship. The Irish finished a perfect 12–0 in 1988, its last undefeated season and national championship to date.

Occasionally, despite his lack of success with the N.Y. Jets, he was rumored to be leaving Notre Dame for the NFL. Following a 6–10 season in 1990 and an 8–8 showing in 1991, the Minnesota Vikings were rumored to replace Jerry Burns with Holtz. However, Holtz denied these rumors each of those two seasons. Holtz remained at Notre Dame; the Vikings, meanwhile, hired Dennis Green to replace the retired Jerry Burns. Holtz nearly replaced Green five years later after retiring from Notre Dame.

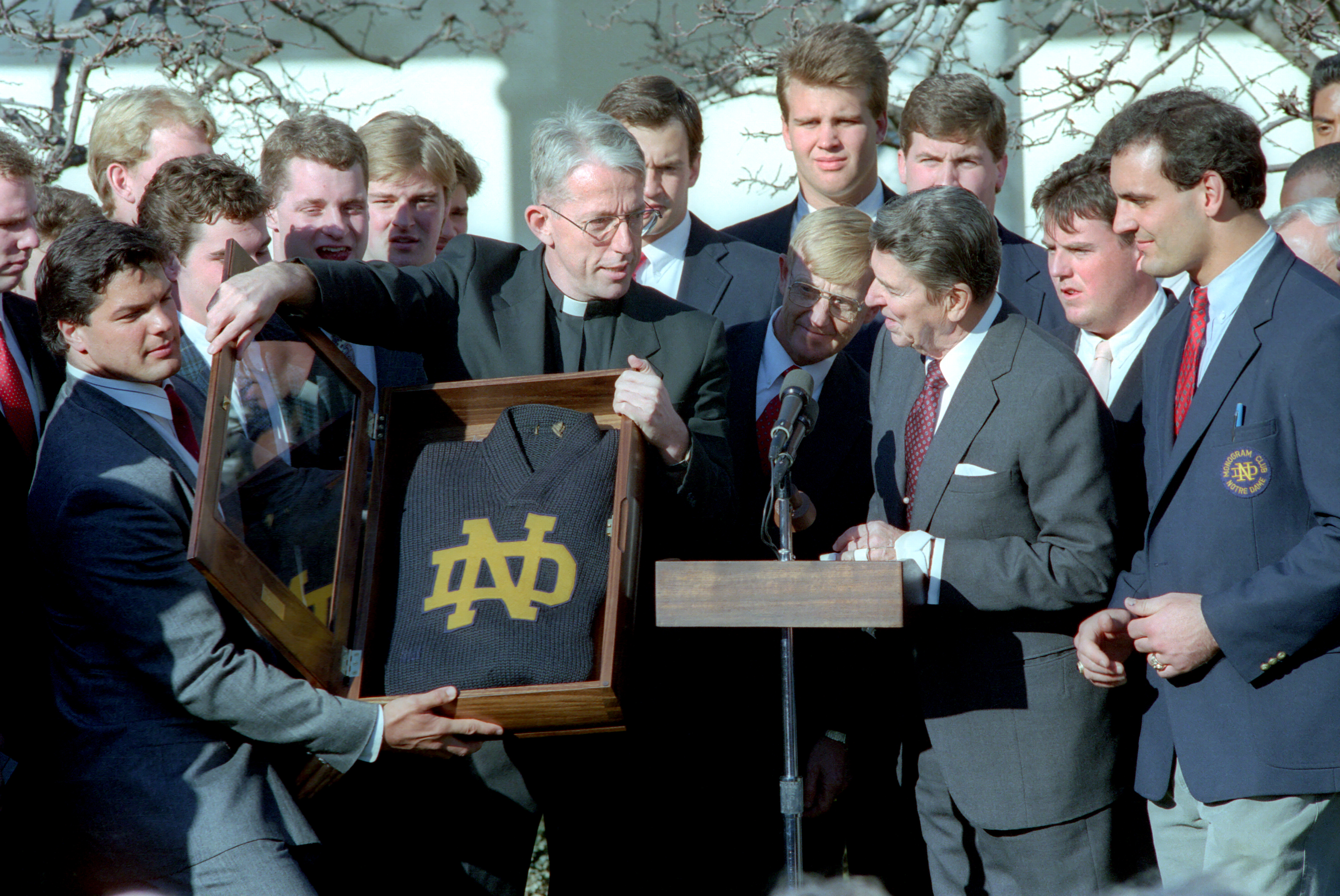
The 1988 national champion Fighting Irish visited President Ronald Reagan in the White House in January 1989.

In 1989, Holtz led the Irish to a 12–1 record. The Irish began the season in the Kickoff Classic game in East Rutherford, New Jersey against Virginia. The Irish won by a score of 36–13. Next, top-ranked Notre Dame defeated #2 Michigan by a score of 24–19. That was followed by wins over Michigan State, Purdue, Stanford, #17 Air Force, #9 USC, #7 Pittsburgh, Navy, SMU and #17 Penn State. The Irish would lose to #7 Miami the following week, ending Notre Dame's 23-game winning streak. Holtz would lead the Irish to a victory in the Orange Bowl over #1 Colorado to end the season.

Holtz led the Fighting Irish to a 9–3 record in 1990. The season began with a #1 ranking and a victory over #4 Michigan by a score of 28–24. The Irish defeated #24 Michigan State the following week then beat Purdue. The Irish would suffer its first defeat of the season the next week, losing to Stanford by a score of 36–31. The Irish would rebound to post five consecutive wins, defeating Air Force, #2 Miami, Pittsburgh, Navy and #9 Tennessee. After losing 24–21 to #22 Penn State, the Irish defeated USC by a score of 10–6 in the regular season finale. The Irish would get a rematch with Colorado in the Orange Bowl but would lose by a score of 10–9.

The Fighting Irish would go 10–3 in 1991. After defeating Indiana to open the season, the Irish lost to #4 Michigan by a score of 24–14. The Irish won their next seven, defeating Michigan State, Purdue, Stanford, #12 Pittsburgh, Air Force, USC and Navy. The Irish would suffer a defeat to #13 Tennessee at home, blowing a 24-point lead to lose by a score of 35–34. Notre Dame would then lose back-to-back games for the first time since 1987 when they lost to unranked Penn State, their first loss to an unranked opponent also since 1987. The Irish would close out the regular season with a victory over Hawaii by a score of 48–42. The Irish would receive a berth in the Sugar Bowl in New Orleans, Louisiana, where they defeated Florida by a score of 39–28.

In 1992, Notre Dame finished 10–1–1. After defeating Northwestern to start the season, the Fighting Irish tied #5 Michigan, their first tie of the Holtz era. After defeating Michigan State and Purdue, the Irish lost to #19 Stanford by a score of 33–16. Notre Dame would win out for the rest of the season, defeating Pittsburgh, BYU, Navy, #9 Boston College, #21 Penn State, #23 USC and the Cotton Bowl against #3 Texas A&M.

The Irish would enjoy another successful season in 1993, finishing the season at 11–1. After scoring 27 points in wins over Northwestern and #2 Michigan to start the season, the Irish defeated Michigan State, Purdue, Pittsburgh, BYU, USC, Navy and #1 Florida State. However, a loss to #12 Boston College on a game-winning field goal as time expired by a score of 41–39 ended the Irish's national championship aspirations. The Irish would face a rematch with #6 Texas A&M in the Cotton Bowl to finish the season, a game the Irish won by a score of 24–21.

In 1994, Holtz led Notre Dame to a 6–5–1 record, the Irish's worst record since Holtz's first season in 1986. The Irish would begin by defeating Northwestern but would lose to #5 Michigan by a score of 26–24. The Irish defeated Michigan State the following week by a score of 21–20. After wins over Purdue and Stanford, the Irish would lose three of their next four to drop out of the rankings for the first time since 1986. After beating Navy, the Fighting Irish lost to #6 Florida State by a score of 23–16. After beating Air Force, Notre Dame tied USC and lost to #5 Colorado in the Fiesta Bowl by a score of 41–24.

The Irish would improve to 9–3 in 1995. Despite getting upset by Northwestern to begin the season, the Irish won their next three, defeating Purdue, Vanderbilt (a game in which Coach Holtz missed because of a health issue and defensive coordinator Bob Davie filled in as head coach for the game), and #10 Texas. After losing to #6 Ohio State, the Irish reeled off six straight wins, defeating #15 Washington, Army, #5 USC, Boston College, Navy and Air Force. The Irish finished the 1995 campaign by losing to #8 Florida State in the Orange Bowl.

Lou Holtz's last season at Notre Dame in 1996 resulted in an 8–3 record. After defeating Vanderbilt, Purdue and #8 Texas, the Irish lost to #4 Ohio State. Notre Dame would finish the season with a win over #16 Washington, a loss to Air Force in overtime, a win over Navy, a win over Boston College, a win over Pittsburgh, a win over Rutgers and an overtime loss to USC, snapping the Irish's 13-game non-losing streak against the Trojans.

Holtz's option offense, which helped catapult Notre Dame to many victories in the late 1980s and early 1990s, also helped rack up impressive recruiting classes. During the 1989 season, Holtz had the following future NFL players on offense: QB Rick Mirer, RB Ricky Watters, RB Anthony Johnson, RB Rodney Culver, RB Dorsey Levens, and WR Raghib Ismail. In 1990, he added RB Jeff Burris (who would later move to Safety), FB Jerome Bettis and TE Irv Smith. 1991 saw the additions of RB Reggie Brooks and FB Ray Zellars. 1992 saw the addition of WR Derrick Mayes. For 1993, he added FB Marc Edwards. In 1995, he added RB Autry Denson. From the 1987–1991 NFL drafts, there were 33 Notre Dame players selected. From the 1992–1995 NFL Drafts, there were 32 Notre Dame players selected. Overall, Holtz took Notre Dame to one undefeated season, nine consecutive New Year's Day bowl games, and top 10 finishes in the AP poll in five seasons. Holtz retired from Notre Dame following the 1996 season, but would unretire in 1999 to accept the head coaching position at South Carolina where he would serve until the completion of the 2004 season.

=== Bob Davie (1997–2001) ===
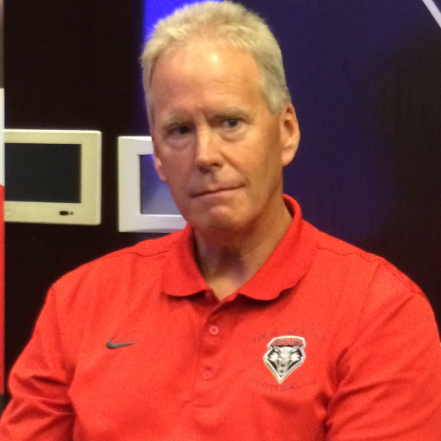
Coach Davie

Bob Davie, who had been Holtz's defensive coordinator from 1994 to 1996, was promoted to head coach when Holtz retired. Davie, who turned down a head coaching offer from Purdue to accept the Irish's head coaching position, was a well-respected defensive mind who had also served as defensive coordinator at Tulane and Texas A&M. Davie had also filled in as head coach for one game during the 1995 season when Lou Holtz was dealing with a health issue. One of his first major decisions was to fire long-time offensive line coach Joe Moore, who then successfully sued the university for age discrimination. On Davie's watch, the team suffered three bowl game losses (1997 Independence Bowl, 1999 Gator Bowl, and 2001 Fiesta Bowl), and it failed to qualify for a bowl game in two others (1999 and 2001). The highlight of Davie's tenure was a 36–20 upset win in 1998 over #5 Michigan, the defending national champions. Davie's Irish also posted a 25–24 home victory over USC in 1999. Davie nearly defeated top ranked Nebraska in 2000, with the Irish comeback bid falling short in overtime 27–24. The aforementioned 2001 Fiesta Bowl was Notre Dame's first invitation to the Bowl Championship Series. The Irish lost by 32 points to Oregon State, but would finish No. 15 in the AP Poll, Davie's highest ranking as head coach. The 2001 squad was awarded the American Football Coaches Association Achievement Award for its 100% graduation rate.

On December 17, 1999, Notre Dame was placed on probation by the NCAA for the only time in its history. The association's Committee on Infractions found two series of violations. The New York Times reported "the main one involved the actions of a booster, Kimberly Dunbar, who lavished gifts on football players with money she later pleaded guilty to embezzling." In the second series of events, a football player was accused of trying to sell several complimentary game tickets and of using others as repayment of a loan. The player was also said "to have been romantically involved with a woman (not Dunbar), a part-time tutor at the university, who wrote a term paper for another player for a small fee and provided players with meals, lodging and gifts." The Dunbar violation began while Lou Holtz was head coach: "According to the NCAA committee report, Dunbar, the woman at the center of the more serious violations, had become romantically involved with several Notre Dame football players from June 1995 to January 1998 and had a child with one, Jarvis Edison." Notre Dame was placed on probation for two years and lost one of its 85 football scholarships each year in what the Times termed "minor" penalties. Following the 1998 season, the team fell into a pattern of frustrating inconsistency and alternated between successful and mediocre seasons. Despite Davie's rocky tenure, new athletic director Kevin White gave the coach a contract extension following the Fiesta Bowl-capped 2000 season, then saw the team start 0–3 in 2001 – the first such start in school history. Disappointed by the on-field results, coupled with the Joe Moore and Kim Dunbar scandals, the administration decided to dismiss Davie after the 2001 season. His final record at Notre Dame was 35–25. After departing Notre Dame, Davie accepted an offer from ESPN to serve as a play-by-play broadcast college football analyst, a position he would hold for ten years before New Mexico hired him to be their head football coach in December 2011.

==== George O'Leary controversy ====
On December 9, 2001, Notre Dame hired George O'Leary, the head coach at Georgia Tech, to replace Davie. However, while researching a "local boy done good" story on O'Leary, (Manchester) Union Leader reporter Jim Fennell uncovered misrepresentations in O'Leary's resume that had influenced the administration's decision to hire him. The resulting media scandal embarrassed Notre Dame officials, and tainted O'Leary; he resigned five days later, before coaching a single practice, recruiting a single player, or hiring a single assistant coach. O'Leary's tenure is the shortest of any head coach in FBS history. O'Leary would go on to become the head football coach at the University of Central Florida.

=== Tyrone Willingham (2002–2004) ===
Once again in need of a new head coach, the school turned to Tyrone Willingham, the head coach at Stanford. Willingham's hiring made him the first African American head coach in Notre Dame football history. Bringing a feeling of change and excitement to campus, Willingham led the 2002 squad to a 10–2 regular season record, including an 8–0 start with wins over #7 Michigan and #11 Florida State, and a No. 4 ranking. This great early start, however, would be the lone highlight of Willingham's tenure, as Notre Dame finished the year with a heart-breaking loss to Boston College, then lopsided losses to USC and North Carolina State in the Gator Bowl. The program faltered over the next two seasons under Willingham, compiling an 11–12 record. During this time, Notre Dame lost a game by at least 30 points on five occasions. Furthermore, Willingham's 2004 recruiting class was judged by analysts to be the worst at Notre Dame in more than two decades. Citing Notre Dame's third consecutive four-touchdown loss to arch-rival USC compounded by another year of sub-par recruiting efforts, the Willingham era ended on November 30, 2004 (after the conclusion of the 2004 season) when the university chose to terminate him and pay out the remainder of Willingham's six-year contract. Willingham wouldn't be unemployed for long, however, as he would accept the head coaching position at Washington two weeks after he was fired by the Irish.

=== Charlie Weis (2005–2009) ===
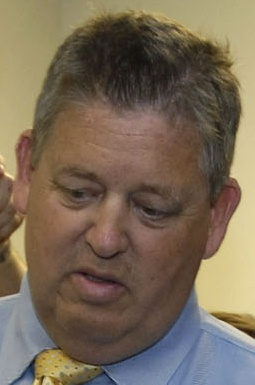
Coach Weis

After Willingham's firing, Notre Dame initially pursued Utah head coach Urban Meyer, who had been an Irish assistant from 1996 to 2000 and had a clause in his Utah contract that stated he could take the Notre Dame head coaching job without paying a buyout. After Meyer accepted the Florida head coaching position and turned down the Irish, Charlie Weis left the NFL's New England Patriots, where he won three Super Bowls as offensive coordinator, to become head football coach for the Irish beginning with the 2005 season. A first time head coach when he was hired by Notre Dame, Weis was officially introduced on December 12, 2004. Weis' hiring as the Irish's 30th head football coach made him the first Notre Dame graduate to hold the football head coaching position on a full-fledged basis since Joe Kuharich (a 1938 Notre Dame graduate). Weis signed a six-year contract worth about $2 million annually excluding incentives.

In his inaugural season he led Notre Dame to a record of 9–3, including an appearance in the Fiesta Bowl, where they were defeated by the Ohio State Buckeyes 34–20. In the first half of the first game (against Pittsburgh), Notre Dame had gained more offensive yards than it had in five games combined, during the previous season. On September 25, Weis and the Irish traveled to Seattle, Washington to face Washington and former head coach Tyrone Willingham, who was hired by the Huskies to be their head coach two weeks after getting fired at Notre Dame. The Irish won by a score of 36–17. Quarterback Brady Quinn would go on to break numerous team passing records that season and rise to the national spotlight, by holding 35 Notre Dame records as well as becoming a top Heisman Trophy contender. Wide receiver Jeff Samardzija would be the team's leading receiver and would go on to a successful career in Major League Baseball as a pitcher for the San Francisco Giants. Tight end Anthony Fasano would be another key offensive player during the 2005 season who would go on to an NFL career with the Dallas Cowboys, Miami Dolphins, Kansas City Chiefs and Tennessee Titans. During the 2005 season, Notre Dame signed Weis to a big raise and ten-year contract extension that was set to keep the coach in South Bend through the 2015 season.

Weis and the Irish went into the 2006 season with a No. 2 preseason ranking in the ESPN/Coaches Poll. They finished the regular season with a 10–2 record, losing only to Michigan and USC. Notre Dame accepted a bid to the 2007 Sugar Bowl, losing to LSU 41–14. This marked their ninth consecutive post-season loss, the longest drought in NCAA history. As a result, Notre Dame dropped to No. 17 in the final rankings. In the wake of a graduating class that sent eleven players to the NFL, the 2007 season (3–9) included various negative milestones: the most losses in a single year (9); two of the ten worst losses ever (38–0 losses to both Michigan and USC); and the first 6-game losing streak for home games. The Naval Academy recorded their first win over the Irish since 1963, breaking the NCAA-record 43-game streak.

In 2008, the Irish started 4–1, but completed the regular season with a 6–6 record, including a 24–23 home loss to Syracuse, the first time that Notre Dame had fallen to an eight-loss team. Quarterback Jimmy Clausen would be the team's star player, completing over 60% of his passes his sophomore season in 2008. Despite speculation the university might fire Weis, it was announced he would remain head coach. Weis's Notre Dame squad ended the season breaking the Irish's NCAA record nine-game bowl losing streak by beating Hawaii, 49–21, in the Hawaii Bowl. After the 2008 season, offensive coordinator Mike Haywood left to accept the head coaching position at Miami (OH). Instead of hiring a replacement, Weis elected to assume offensive coordinator duties himself, which included calling the plays.

Charlie Weis entered the 2009 season with the expectation from the Notre Dame administration that his team would be in position to compete for a BCS Bowl berth. Notre Dame started the first part of the season 4–2, with close losses to Michigan and USC. Many of their wins were also close, aside from a 35–0 victory over Nevada and a 40–14 defeat of Washington State. Sitting at 6–2, however, Notre Dame lost a close game at Notre Dame Stadium to Navy, 23–21. This loss was the second to Navy in the last three years, and would be the first loss in a four-game losing streak to finish the season. The following week, Notre Dame lost to #8 Pittsburgh, then lost to UConn at home in double overtime on senior day. The Irish lost to Stanford the last week of the season by a score of 45–38. Quarterback Jimmy Clausen and wide receiver Golden Tate would forgo their senior seasons and enter the NFL draft.

Weis was fired on November 30, 2009, exactly five years after his predecessor. According to Weis' buyout, he was to be paid $6 million then $2.05 million annually until the contract ran out in December 2015 for a total of about $19 million. During that time, Weis made more money annually not to coach the Irish than his successor, Brian Kelly, made to coach the team. After leaving Notre Dame, Weis would serve as offensive coordinator for the NFL's Kansas City Chiefs in 2010 as well as Florida under Will Muschamp in 2011 before accepting the head coaching position at Kansas in December 2011. His hiring made him the fifth consecutive former Notre Dame head coach (sixth counting George O'Leary) to be hired as head coach by another FBS school; joining Gerry Faust (Akron), Lou Holtz (South Carolina), Bob Davie (New Mexico) and Tyrone Willingham (Washington). O'Leary was hired by Central Florida.

=== Brian Kelly era (2010–2021) ===
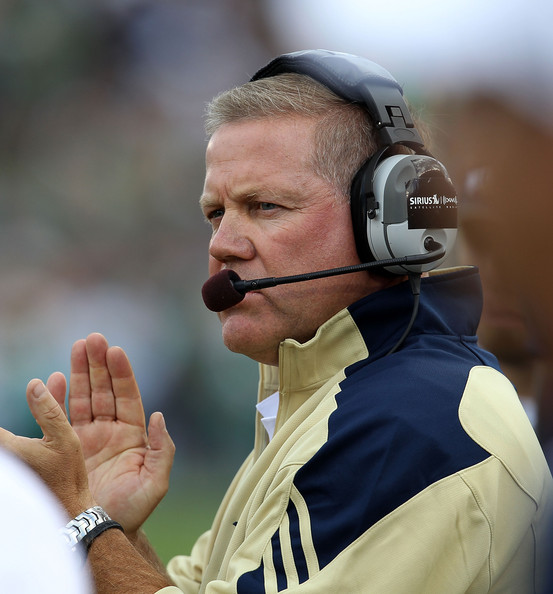
Coach Kelly

On December 10, 2009, Cincinnati head coach Brian Kelly became the 31st head coach of the Fighting Irish after leading the Bearcats to a 12–0 record and BCS bowl-game berth, but he left the team before the bowl game. Kelly's hiring surprised very few as he was a northern Irish Catholic who was considered one of college football's rising stars. In his first season, Kelly led the Fighting Irish to an 8–5 record. Tragedy struck early in the season when Declan Sullivan, a junior working for the athletic department, died while filming a practice on a scissor lift in dangerously high winds. Dayne Crist started the season at quarterback but was injured for a second consecutive year, this time in the Tulsa game, which the Irish lost. Kelly turned to freshman quarterback Tommy Rees, who led the Irish to victories in the last three games against No. 14 Utah, Army in Yankee Stadium, and breaking an eight-year losing streak to USC in the LA Coliseum. Kelly guided the Irish to a 33–17 win over Miami (FL) in the 2010 Sun Bowl to finish 2010 with an 8–5 record. With senior wide out Michael Floyd returning for his senior season and an outstanding recruiting class that included several highly touted defensive linemen,

Kelly and the Irish looked to improve on their 8–5 record from the prior year. However, an early season upset to a Skip Holtz-led South Florida team, and a last second loss to Michigan in Ann Arbor left the Irish at 0–2 to start the season. The Irish bounced back to beat #15 Michigan State and had two 4-game winning-streaks, with the only loss during that stretch coming at the hands of USC. The Irish also broke Navy's 2-game winning streak over Notre Dame (2009–10). Notre Dame finished the season with an 8–4 record but lost 18–14 to Florida State in the 2011 Champs Sports Bowl, concluding the 2011 campaign with and 8–5 record overall, identical to the 2010 season. In the team's losses, multiple turnovers from the quarterback position were often the culprit, and as a whole turnovers at critical times in the game often derailed potential Irish comebacks. After the 2011 season, offensive coordinator Charley Molnar left ND to accept the head coaching position at UMass. Safeties coach and recruiting coordinator Chuck Martin would move over to the offensive side of the ball as Molnar's replacement running the offense.

On September 12, 2012, during the football program's 125th season, Notre Dame announced that it would leave the Big East Conference for the Atlantic Coast Conference (ACC), excluding the football and hockey programs. This move became official on July 1, 2013, in time for the fall sports to compete within the ACC conference. While the Fighting Irish football team will remain an FBS independent, it has agreed to play five games per season against ACC teams starting with the 2014 football season, as the schedule allows. In return, Notre Dame will become eligible to participate in the ACC's sub-BCS level bowl arrangements.

On November 18, 2012, Notre Dame was ranked No. 1 in the nation in both the AP and Coaches' polls after reaching 11–0 during the regular season for the first time since 1993, also ranking No. 1 in the BCS standings for the first time in the 14-year history of the selection system. After defeating the University of Southern California Trojans on November 24, 2012, Notre Dame concluded its first 12–0 regular season, and on December 2, 2012, the Irish were formally named to appear in the BCS National Championship Game for the first time in the 2013 BCS National Championship Game. In that game, on January 7, 2013, the Irish lost to Alabama 42–14.

Coming off the previous year's national title game appearance, the Fighting Irish were dealt a blow when 2012 starting quarterback, Everett Golson, was suspended from the University due to an academic violation. Senior Tommy Rees then took over. Notre Dame's 2013 season ended with a record of 9–4 and a victory over Rutgers in the Pinstripe Bowl. Notre Dame finished No. 20 in the AP poll. After the 2013 season, offensive coordinator Chuck Martin left ND to accept the head coaching position at Miami (OH), marking the second assistant coach to leave Kelly's staff to accept an FBS head coaching job. Mike Denbrock was promoted from wide receivers coach to offensive coordinator to replace Martin.

The 2014 season started off with 6 straight victories and a #5 national ranking heading into a showdown with #2 Florida State in Tallahassee, Florida. FSU won that game 31–27, on a controversial offensive pass interference call that brought back a last second Notre Dame touchdown. The Fighting Irish bounced back with a win against Navy before dropping their final 4 games of the season. They did win the Music City Bowl by defeating the LSU Tigers and finished the season at an 8–5 record. After the 2014 season, the Irish again changed offensive coordinators, as Mike Denbrock stepped down from the position due to prostate cancer and returned to coaching the team's receivers.

The 2015 Fighting Irish began its season with another new offensive coordinator, Mike Sanford Jr. That year's squad is arguably the most explosive offense that Brian Kelly has coached at Notre Dame. During the regular season, the Irish were one of twenty-one schools in the country to average 200 or more passing yards and rushing yards per game. The Irish had fourteen plays of over 50 yards during the season, which ranked 13th in the country and was a school record. They also had two touchdowns of over 90 yards, (a 91-yard touchdown run by C. J. Prosise and a 98-yard touchdown run by Josh Adams). The Irish only had two in the previous 126 years of Notre Dame football. The running game was dominant. The 5.76 yards per carry were fifth in the country. They finished the regular season averaging 34 points per game, including a 62-point effort against UMass, the most points in a game since 1996. The Irish finished their 2015 season with a 10–3 record, a ranking of #11 in the AP and #12 in the Coaches' Poll and a Fiesta Bowl appearance, a loss to Ohio State.

The 2016 season ended with a 4–8 record, Brian Kelly's worst win–loss record at Notre Dame up to that point. The tone for the season was set early, with a heartbreaking double overtime loss to Texas in the season opener. On September 24, Notre Dame lost to Duke by a score of 38–35. Just 4 games into the season, Brian Kelly fired defensive coordinator Brian VanGorder. Mike Elko was hired from Wake Forest as VanGorder's replacement. After a sloppy 10–3 loss to NC State in Raleigh, North Carolina during messy conditions due to Hurricane Matthew, Kelly publicly called out his starting center over "poor snapping and atrocious play". At the end of the season, starting quarterback DeShone Kizer declared for the NFL Draft and backup quarterback Malik Zaire announced he would be transferring in the winter after graduation. Offensive coordinator Mike Sanford Jr. left the ND staff after the season to accept the head coaching position at Western Kentucky, making him the third Irish OC under Kelly to accept an FBS head coaching position. Chip Long was hired from Memphis as his replacement. Mike Denbrock also departed the Notre Dame staff, accepting the offensive coordinator position at Cincinnati under new head coach Luke Fickell. Amidst speculation that Kelly's job was in jeopardy and that Kelly was looking to leave Notre Dame, athletics director Jack Swarbrick announced that Kelly would return for the 2017 season.

The 2017 season ended with a 10-3 record, and a win in the Citrus Bowl over LSU. On the surface, this was one of Kelly's strongest seasons at ND. An early one-point loss to #2 Georgia set the tone for the first half of the season. The tough running of running back Josh Adams behind an experienced and talented offensive line allowed Notre Dame to string together 6 consecutive 20+ point victories against solid competition like #11 USC and #14 NC State. But it all came crashing down when #3 Notre Dame visited #7 Miami in South Florida on Nov 7, 2017. An embarrassing 41-8 loss effectively ended the Irish hopes of a playoff run. They went on to struggle in final games to Navy (W 24-17) and Stanford (L 20-38). The strong start and disappointing finish made for mixed feeling among Irish fans after a horrific 2016 season.

The Irish opened the 2018 season at home against Michigan and won, 24–17. The Irish then won the remainder of their regular season games, including victories over #7 Stanford, #24 Virginia Tech, #12 Syracuse, and Northwestern. This led to Notre Dame's first undefeated regular season since 2012. They were ranked #3 in the nation by the College Football Playoff committee as of December 2, 2018, and selected to play in the College Football Playoff Semifinal at the Goodyear Cotton Bowl Classic against Clemson on December 29, 2018. Notre Dame's undefeated streak came to an end after losing to Clemson 30–3 to finish the season at 12–1. He was named AP Coach of the Year and Home Depot Coach of the Year for the 2018 season. Kelly and the Fighting Irish started off the season with a #9 ranking in the AP Poll. Notre Dame won their first two games before dropping a 23–17 result to #3 Georgia. Notre Dame won their next three games before dropping a 45–14 game to #19 Michigan. Notre Dame closed out the regular season with victories in their last five games. Notre Dame won the Camping World Bowl 33–9 over Iowa State.

In response to the COVID-19 pandemic and the cancellation of regular season scheduled games, Notre Dame joined the Atlantic Coast Conference (ACC) in football for a single season and played a full slate of conference matches. The Irish won all ten of their games, including a mid-season contest against perennial conference power and top-ranked Clemson. The Fighting Irish defeated the Tigers 47–40 in 2OT However, Clemson defeated the Irish in a rematch in the ACC Championship Game 34–10. He was named as the ACC Coach of the Year. Notre Dame qualified for the College Football Playoff as the #4-seed. In the College Football Playoff Semifinals against Alabama at the Rose Bowl, Notre Dame lost 31–4 to give Kelly a 10–2 mark in the 2020 season. In Kelly's 11th season, the Fighting Irish were ranked in the top 10 after a playoff appearance in 2020. However, they struggled in their first two games, beating Florida State 41–38 and Toledo 32–29 before winning over Purdue 27–13 and 18th-ranked Wisconsin at Soldier Field 41–13. Following a 24–13 loss to #7 Cincinnati, Kelly helped lead the Fighting Irish to a seven-game winning streak to finish the season.

On November 29, 2021, Kelly resigned as Notre Dame head coach to accept a ten-year, $95 million contract offer to become head coach at LSU. In so doing, Kelly became the first Irish head coach since Thomas A. Barry in 1907 to leave Notre Dame for another coaching job. Additionally, Kelly became the sixth consecutive (and seventh counting George O'Leary) Irish head coach to be hired as a head coach at another FBS school after leaving Notre Dame. Kelly left the Irish as the program's all-time winningest head coach.

=== Marcus Freeman era (2021–present) ===
On December 3, 2021, Notre Dame's defensive coordinator Marcus Freeman was promoted to the head coaching position to replace Brian Kelly, becoming the 32nd head coach in program history. The second African American head coach in the history of the Irish football program, Freeman signed a five-year contract worth $4 million annually excluding incentives. Freeman took control immediately, coaching the Irish in their Fiesta Bowl loss to Oklahoma State. Freeman opened the 2022 season with losses to Ohio State and Marshall, thus becoming first head coach in Notre Dame history to start his tenure with three losses. He gained his first win the following week against the Golden Bears. Freeman's Irish would go on to finish the regular season ranked 19th with a record of 8-4, including an upset win over No. 5 Clemson. They were awarded a berth in the Gator Bowl where they defeated South Carolina 45–38.
