= Art Best =

American football player (1953–2014)

No. 25, 39
- Position: Running back

Personal information
- Born: March 18, 1953; Camden, New Jersey, U.S.
- Died: October 14, 2014 (aged 61); Pickerington, Ohio, U.S.
- Listed height: 6 ft 1 in (1.85 m)
- Listed weight: 205 lb (93 kg)

Career information
- High school: Bishop Hartley (Columbus, Ohio)
- College: Notre Dame (1972–1974); Kent State (1976)
- NFL draft: 1977: 6th round, 156th overall pick

Career history
- Chicago Bears (1977–1978); New York Giants (1980)

Awards and highlights
- National champion (1973)
- Stats at Pro Football Reference

Arthur Robie Best (March 18, 1953 – October 14, 2014) was an American professional football running back who played three seasons in the National Football League (NFL) with the Chicago Bears and New York Giants. He was selected by the Los Angeles Rams in the sixth round of the 1977 NFL draft. He played college football at the University of Notre Dame and Kent State University.

== Early life ==
Arthur Robie Best was born on March 18, 1953, in Camden, New Jersey. He grew up in Gahanna, Ohio and attended Bishop Hartley High School in Columbus, Ohio.

== College career ==
Best first played college football for the Notre Dame Fighting Irish of the University of Notre Dame from 1972 to 1974. He rushed 17 times for 158 yards and two touchdowns in 1972. In 1973, he totaled 118 carries for 700 yards and three touchdowns, and four catches for 48 yards. The 1973 Fighting Irish were AP Poll national champions. Best recorded 51 rushing attempts for 241 yards and three receptions for 54 yards in 1974.

Best then transferred to Kent State University, where he lettered for the Kent State Golden Flashes in 1976. He rushed 194 times for 1,030 yards and ten touchdowns that season while also returning six kicks for 102 yards.

== Professional career ==
Best was selected by the Los Angeles Rams in the sixth round, with the 156th overall pick, of the 1977 NFL draft, and thereafter signed with the team.

On October 7, 1977, he was traded to the Chicago Bears. He played in all 14 games for the Bears during his rookie year in 1977, recording six carries for 20 yards and six kick returns for 127 yards. He also played in one playoff game that season. He appeared in all 16 games in 1978, rushing two times for 11 yards. Best was released by the Bears on August 27, 1979.

Best signed with the New York Giants on March 1, 1980. He played in the first game of the 1980 season before being released on September 8, 1980.

== Personal life ==
Best worked as a construction project manager after his NFL career. He died on October 14, 2014, in Pickerington, Ohio. He had cancer and liver problems for at least five years before his death.
