= Cliff Brown (American football) =

American football player (1952–2012)

No. 8
- Position: Quarterback / Placekicker / Running back

Personal information
- Born: June 14, 1952; Middletown, Pennsylvania, U.S.
- Died: December 10, 2012 (aged 60); Harrisburg, Pennsylvania, U.S.
- Listed height: 6 ft 0 in (1.83 m)
- Listed weight: 205 lb (93 kg)

Career information
- College: Notre Dame
- NFL draft: 1974: 17th round, 427th overall pick

Career history
- Philadelphia Eagles (1974)*
- * Offseason or practice squad member only

Awards and highlights
- National champion (1973)

Clifton Brown Sr. (June 14, 1952 – December 10, 2012) was an American football quarterback for the University of Notre Dame, and was the first African-American quarterback to start a game for the prestigious program.

After future Hall-of-Famer Joe Theismann graduated in 1971, Irish head coach Ara Parseghian selected Pat Steenberge to start the first two games of the next season. Following a leg injury to Steenberge, backup Bill Etter started the next two games, and then he too suffered a knee injury that ended his season. Cliff Brown then went into action in the second quarter against Miami, and led the team to a 17–0 victory. Brown started all of the remaining games in the season, losing only to USC and LSU.

The following year, sophomore Tom Clements started at quarterback, and Brown was the primary backup for both the 1972 and 1973 seasons. Brown's last touchdown at Notre Dame came in the final regular-season game of the 1973 national championship season—a 6-yard run at the end of a 44–0 rout of Miami. Brown was selected in the 17th round of the 1974 NFL draft by the Philadelphia Eagles as a running back; he did not make the final roster.

Brown died on December 10, 2012, at the age of 60.
