= 1973 Sugar Bowl =

American college football game

- 40th Sugar Bowl; National Championship Game (Note: Through luck and fortuitous scheduling, a "national championship game" was occasionally able to settle the matter on the field, as described in some contemporaneous reports. Despite the promotional billing, in several instances there were plausible scenarios for a third team to be selected as national champion by the major selectors, depending on outcomes of other games.) (Note: Title game for NFF MacArthur Bowl; No. 2 Oklahoma finished 10–0–1, was on probation and ineligible for a bowl game but still eligible for the AP Trophy. The NFF announced on December 2 that the winner of the Sugar Bowl would receive the MacArthur Bowl, and that Alabama and Notre Dame would be co-champions in the case of a tie.)
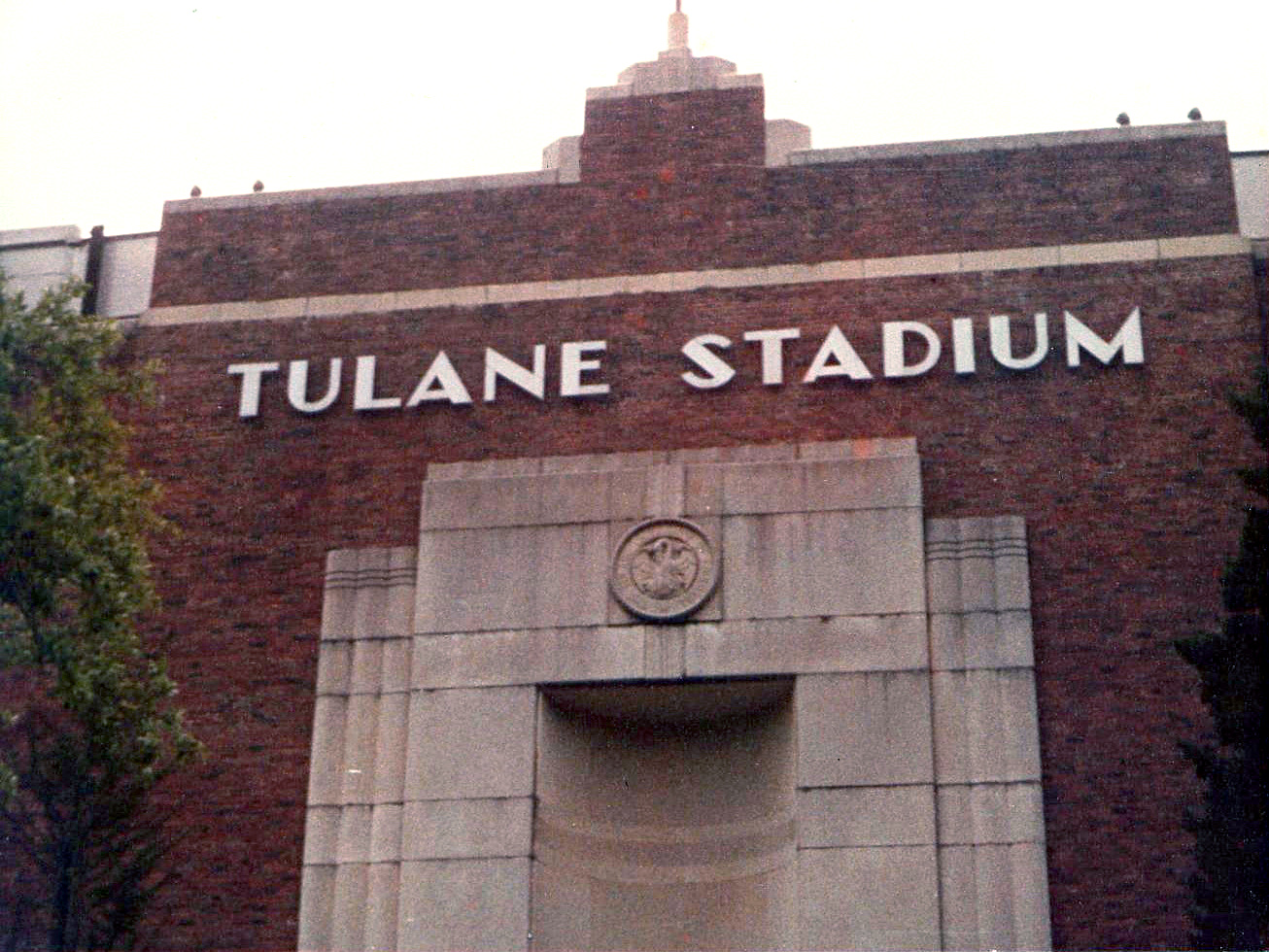
- Tulane Stadium in New Orleans, Louisiana, hosted the Sugar Bowl.
| Notre Dame Fighting Irish | Alabama Crimson Tide |
| (10–0) | (11–0) |
| Independent | SEC |
| 24 | 23 |
| Head coach: Ara Parseghian | Head coach: Bear Bryant |
| AP / Coaches; 3 / 4 | AP / Coaches; 1 / 1 |
| | 1 | 2 | 3 | 4 | Total |
|---|---|---|---|---|---|
| Notre Dame | 6 | 8 | 7 | 3 | 24 |
| Alabama | 0 | 10 | 7 | 6 | 23 |
- Date: December 31, 1973
- Season: 1973
- Stadium: Tulane Stadium
- Location: New Orleans, Louisiana
- MVP: Tom Clements, Notre Dame QB
- Favorite: Alabama by 6½ points
- Referee: Gene Calhoun (Big Ten) (split crew: Big Ten, SEC)
- Attendance: 85,161

United States TV coverage
- Network: ABC
- Announcers: Chris Schenkel, Bud Wilkinson, and Howard Cosell
- Nielsen ratings: 25.3

The 1973 Sugar Bowl, part of the 1973 bowl game season, took place on December 31, 1973, at Tulane Stadium in New Orleans, Louisiana. The top-ranked Alabama Crimson Tide of the Southeastern Conference (SEC) met the independent Notre Dame Fighting Irish; both teams were undefeated.

Underdog Notre Dame won 24–23; the game received a 25.3 Nielsen rating, making it one of the highest-rated college football games in history.

== Teams ==
=== Alabama ===
Alabama completed the 1973 regular season with an 11–0 record, as conference champions and as national champions as determined by the final UPI coaches poll, released in early December. Following their victory over Auburn, university officials announced they accepted an invitation to play in the Sugar Bowl. The appearance marked the sixth for Alabama in the Sugar Bowl, their 27th overall bowl game appearance and their first all-time meeting against Notre Dame.

=== Notre Dame ===
Notre Dame finished the regular season with a 10–0 record. Following their victory over Miami, university officials announced they accepted an invitation to play in the Sugar Bowl. The appearance marked the first for Notre Dame in the Sugar Bowl, and their fifth overall bowl game appearance.

== Game summary ==
The night game kicked off shortly after 7 p.m. CST, televised by ABC. With a cold rain falling, Notre Dame opened the scoring with a Wayne Bullock 6-yard touchdown run, and after a missed extra point took an early 6–0 lead. In the second quarter, Alabama took the lead on a 6-yard Randy Billingsley touchdown run, only to see the Irish go up 14–7 on the following play. The ensuing kickoff was returned 93-yards for a touchdown by Al Hunter. The Tide cut the lead to 14–10 late in the quarter on a 39-yard Bill Davis field goal.

In the third quarter, the teams traded touchdowns with Alabama scoring first on a 5-yard Wilbur Jackson touchdown run and Notre Dame on a 12-yard Eric Penick touchdown run to make the score 21–17 entering the final period. After quarterback Richard Todd made a 25-yard touchdown reception from Mike Stock on a trick play, Davis missed the extra point to only put Alabama up 23–21. The Irish responded with a 19-yard field goal by Bob Thomas to take the lead 24–23 with 4:26 remaining in the game.

Late in the fourth quarter, Alabama pinned Notre Dame back deep in Irish territory with a punt, hoping to get the ball back within easy range of a game-winning field goal. During the punt, the Alabama punter was run into and Notre Dame was flagged with a 15-yard roughing the kicker personal foul. In 1973, a personal foul wasn't an automatic first down in college football, so since it occurred on a 4th and 20, accepting the penalty would have given Alabama a fourth and 5 on their own 45 yard line, only down one with mere minutes remaining. Coach Bear Bryant, knowing even a safety would win the game, decided to decline the penalty and try to stop Notre Dame who had to start on their own 1 yard line. Bryant's strategy seemed ready to pay off when his defense stymied Notre Dame on two plays and forced 3rd and 10 on their 1-yard line. However, on third and long Irish QB Tom Clements connected with backup TE Robin Weber on a long pass that gave the Irish a first down and allowed them to run out the clock. With their victory, the Associated Press awarded the Irish the national championship in ranking them first in their final poll.

=== Scoring summary ===
Scoring summary

| Quarter | Time | Drive | | | Team | Scoring information | Score | |
| Quarter | Time | Plays | Yards | TOP | Team | Scoring information | Notre Dame | Alabama |
|---|---|---|---|---|---|---|---|---|
| 1 | 3:19 | | 6 plays, 64 yards | 2:32 | Notre Dame | Wayne Bullock 6-yard touchdown run, Bob Thomas kick no good | 6 | 0 |
| 2 | 7:30 | | 7 plays, 52 yards | 2:40 | Alabama | Randy Billingsley 6-yard touchdown run, Bill Davis kick good | 6 | 7 |
| 2 | 7:17 | | None | None | Notre Dame | Al Hunter 93-yard kickoff return for a touchdown, 2-point pass good | 14 | 7 |
| 2 | 0:39 | | 7 plays, 69 yards | 2:40 | Alabama | 39-yard field goal by Bill Davis | 14 | 10 |
| 3 | 11:02 | | 11 plays, 93 yards | 3:57 | Alabama | Wilbur Jackson 5-yard touchdown run, Bill Davis kick good | 14 | 17 |
| 3 | 2:30 | | 1 play, 12 yards | 0:07 | Notre Dame | Eric Penick 12-yard touchdown run, Bob Thomas kick good | 21 | 17 |
| 4 | 9:33 | | 5 plays, 39 yards | 2:14 | Alabama | Richard Todd 25-yard touchdown reception from Mike Stock, Bill Davis kick no good | 21 | 23 |
| 4 | 4:26 | | 11 plays, 79 yards | 5:13 | Notre Dame | 19-yard field goal by Bob Thomas | 24 | 23 |
| "TOP" = time of possession. For other American football terms, see Glossary of American football. | | | | | | | 24 | 23 |
