= Tim Rudnick =

American football player (1952-2014)

- Rudnick in 1975

No. 43
- Position: Defensive back

Personal information
- Born: March 6, 1952; Chicago, Illinois, U.S.
- Died: September 7, 2014 (aged 62); Chicago, Illinois, U.S.
- Listed height: 5 ft 10 in (1.78 m)
- Listed weight: 185 lb (84 kg)

Career information
- High school: Notre Dame College Prep (Niles, Illinois)
- College: Notre Dame
- NFL draft: 1974: 11th round, 265th overall pick

Career history
- Baltimore Colts (1974)

Awards and highlights
- National champion (1973)

Career NFL statistics
- Games played: 14
- Stats at Pro Football Reference

Timothy John Rudnick (March 6, 1952 – September 7, 2014) was an American professional football defensive back who played for the Baltimore Colts of the National Football League (NFL). He played college football at Notre Dame in South bend Indiana.
