= Mike Townsend =

American football player (born 1952)

No. 42, 29
- Position: Defensive back

Personal information
- Born: March 19, 1952 (age 74); Brundidge, Alabama, U.S.
- Listed height: 6 ft 3 in (1.91 m)
- Listed weight: 205 lb (93 kg)

Career information
- High school: Garfield (Hamilton, Ohio)
- College: Notre Dame (1970–1973)
- NFL draft: 1974: 4th round, 86th overall pick

Career history
- Jacksonville Sharks (1974); Minnesota Vikings (1975)*; Memphis Southmen (1975); New York Giants (1976)*
- * Offseason or practice squad member only

Awards and highlights
- National champion (1973); Consensus All-American (1973)

Michael Lavon Townsend (born March 19, 1952) is an American former professional football defensive back who played two seasons in the World Football League (WFL) with the Jacksonville Sharks and Memphis Southmen. He was selected by the Minnesota Vikings in the fourth round of the 1974 NFL draft after playing college football at the University of Notre Dame. He was a consensus All-American in 1973.

== Early life ==
Michael Lavon Townsend was born on March 19, 1952, in Brundidge, Alabama. He attended Garfield High School in Hamilton, Ohio.

== College career ==
Townsend was a member of the Notre Dame Fighting Irish football team from 1970 to 1973. He led the nation with a school-record ten interceptions as a junior in 1972. Townsend was a captain on the Notre Dame 1973 national championship team. He was a consensus All-American in 1973. He played in the Hula Bowl after his senior season. He played with his brother Willie Townsend all four years at Notre Dame.

== Professional career ==
Townsend was selected by the Minnesota Vikings in the fourth round, with the 86th overall pick, of the 1974 NFL draft, and by the Jacksonville Sharks in the sixth round, with the 70th overall pick, of the 1974 WFL draft. He chose to sign with the Sharks and played in all 14 games for the Sharks during the 1974 WFL season, recording four interceptions.

In 1975, Towsend signed with the Vikings but was later released on August 25, 1975.

Townsend later played in one game for the Memphis Southmen of the WFL in 1975.

Townsend was signed by the New York Giants on January 27, 1976, but was later released.
