= 1973 Notre Dame Fighting Irish football team =

American college football season

1973 Notre Dame Fighting Irish football

AP Poll national champion FWAA national champion NFF national champion Sugar Bowl champion

Sugar Bowl, W 24–23 vs. Alabama
- Conference: Independent

Ranking
- Coaches: No. 4
- AP: No. 1
- Record: 11–0
- Head coach: Ara Parseghian (10th season)
- Offensive scheme: Wing T
- Defensive coordinator: Joe Yonto
- Base defense: 4–3
- Captains: Dave Casper; Frank Pomarico; Mike Townsend
- Home stadium: Notre Dame Stadium

1973 NCAA Division I independents football records
	Conf.			Overall
Team	W	L	T	W		L		T
No. 1 Notre Dame		–		11	–	0	–	0
No. 5 Penn State		–		12	–	0	–	0
No. 9 Houston		–		11	–	1	–	0
Temple		–		9	–	1	–	0
No. 20 Tulane		–		9	–	3	–	0
Memphis State		–		8	–	3	–	0
Tampa		–		8	–	3	–	0
Boston College		–		7	–	4	–	0
South Carolina		–		7	–	4	–	0
Utah State		–		7	–	4	–	0
Air Force		–		6	–	4	–	0
Southern Miss		–		6	–	4	–	1
Northern Illinois		–		6	–	5	–	0
Rutgers		–		6	–	5	–	0
West Virginia		–		6	–	5	–	0
Pittsburgh		–		6	–	5	–	1
Colgate		–		5	–	5	–	0
Dayton		–		5	–	5	–	1
Xavier		–		5	–	5	–	1
Georgia Tech		–		5	–	6	–	0
Holy Cross		–		5	–	6	–	0
Miami (FL)		–		5	–	6	–	0
Cincinnati		–		4	–	7	–	0
Marshall		–		4	–	7	–	0
Navy		–		4	–	7	–	0
Southern Illinois		–		3	–	7	–	1
Villanova		–		3	–	8	–	0
Syracuse		–		2	–	9	–	0
Virginia Tech		–		2	–	9	–	0
Army		–		0	–	10	–	0
Florida State		–		0	–	11	–	0
Rankings from AP Poll

The 1973 Notre Dame Fighting Irish football team represented the University of Notre Dame during the 1973 NCAA Division I football season. The Irish, coached by Ara Parseghian, ended the season undefeated with 11 wins and no losses, winning the national championship. The Fighting Irish won the title by defeating the previously unbeaten and No. 1 ranked Alabama Crimson Tide in the 1973 Sugar Bowl by a score of a 24–23. The 1973 squad became the ninth Irish team to win the national title and the second under Parseghian. Although Notre Dame finished No. 1 in the AP Poll to claim the AP national title, they were not awarded the Coaches title despite being the last undefeated team at the end of the season, since Alabama was awarded the Coaches Poll title before the bowl season.

Parseghian's second national title team was led by its relentless rushing attack. Fullback Wayne Bullock (750 yards), halfback Art Best (700 yards), halfback Eric Penick (586 yards) and quarterback Tom Clements (360 yards) comprised one of the fastest Irish backfields, with Penick and Best clocking in under 10 seconds in the 100-yard dash. The Irish started the season strong, amassing large margins of victory over Northwestern, Rice and Army to set up a highly anticipated contest with No. 6 and unbeaten USC. USC came into the contest riding a 23-game unbeaten streak, and USC's star tailback Anthony Davis ran over the Irish the previous year for 6 touchdowns in a 45–23 Trojan victory. Moreover, Parseghian had not outright beaten USC since 1966. The Irish defense responded to the challenge, limiting Davis to 55 yards on 19 carries. The star tailback of the day was Notre Dame's Penick, who ran for 118 yards, 50 more than the entire Trojan team. The Irish won the contest 23–14 and won their remaining games. After Notre Dame accepted the Sugar Bowl bid, the stage was set to determine the national championship. Alabama was awarded the UPI title before the bowl season, but it was Notre Dame that won it on the field, winning 24–23 in a thriller that had six lead changes. Notre Dame jumped to a 6–0 lead, but Alabama answered with a Randy Billingsley 6-yard touchdown run. Al Hunter then scored on a 93-yard kickoff return, and Clements completed a two-point conversion pass to Pete Demmerle to give the Irish a 14–7 (which would turn out to be the widest margin in the game). Alabama scored a field goal to close the halftime deficit to 14–10, and then went on a 93-yard touchdown march in the third quarter to regain the lead. Notre Dame answered with a 12-yard touchdown run by Eric Penick to go back in front, 21–17. In the fourth quarter, three turnovers occurred in 90 seconds, with Alabama coming out on top and capitalizing on a halfback pass from Mike Stock to quarterback Richard Todd for a 25-yard touchdown to take a slim 23–21 lead, but the Tide missed the crucial extra point. Notre Dame responded, with Tom Clements driving the Irish 79 yards in 11 plays and setting up a potential field goal on a clutch 15-yard pass to tight end Dave Casper. Irish kicker Bob Thomas kicked a field goal to give the Irish a slim 24–23 victory and the AP national title.

== Schedule ==
Date	Time	Opponent	Rank	Site	TV	Result	Attendance	Source
September 22	2:30 p.m.	Northwestern	No. 8	Notre Dame Stadium; Notre Dame, IN (rivalry)		W 44–0	59,075	
September 29	1:50 p.m.	at Purdue	No. 7	Ross–Ade Stadium; West Lafayette, IN (rivalry)	ABC	W 20–7	69,391	
October 6	2:30 p.m.	Michigan State	No. 8	Notre Dame Stadium; Notre Dame, IN (rivalry)		W 14–10	59,075	
October 13	8:05 p.m.	at Rice	No. 9	Rice Stadium; Houston, TX		W 28–0	50,321	
October 20	2:00 p.m.	at Army	No. 8	Michie Stadium; West Point, NY (rivalry)		W 62–3	42,503	
October 27	1:50 p.m.	No. 6 USC	No. 8	Notre Dame Stadium; Notre Dame, IN (rivalry)	ABC	W 23–14	59,075	
November 3	1:30 p.m.	Navy	No. 5	Notre Dame Stadium; Notre Dame, IN (rivalry)		W 44–7	59,075	
November 10	1:30 p.m.	at No. 20 Pittsburgh	No. 5	Pitt Stadium; Pittsburgh, PA (rivalry)		W 31–10	56,593	
November 22	1:30 p.m.	Air Force	No. 5	Notre Dame Stadium; Notre Dame, IN (rivalry)	ABC	W 48–15	57,236	
December 1	7:33 p.m.	at Miami (FL)	No. 5	Miami Orange Bowl; Miami, FL (rivalry)		W 44–0	42,968	
December 31	8:00 p.m.	vs. No. 1 Alabama	No. 3	Tulane Stadium; New Orleans, LA (Sugar Bowl)	ABC	W 24–23	85,161	
Rankings from AP Poll released prior to the game; All times are in Eastern time; Source:

== Game summaries ==
=== Northwestern ===
Team	1	2	3	4	Total
Northwestern	0	0	0	0	0
• Notre Dame	16	21	0	7	44

- Date: September 22
- Location: Notre Dame Stadium, South Bend, IN
- Game start: 1:30 pm EST
- Game attendance: 59,075
- Game weather: Sunny, 76 degrees

=== Purdue ===
Team	1	2	3	4	Total
• Notre Dame	3	7	7	3	20
Purdue	0	7	0	0	7

- Date: September 29
- Location: Ross–Ade Stadium • West Lafayette, Indiana
- Game start: 12:50 pm EST
- Game attendance: 69,391
- Game weather: Sunny, humid, 79 degrees
- TV announcers (ABC): Chris Schenkel, Bud Wilkinson, Duffy Daugherty

Scoring summary
1	ND	Thomas 22-yard field goal	Notre Dame 3-0
2	PUR	Burton 53-yard pass from Bobrowski (Conner kick)	Purdue 7-3
2	ND	Best 9-yard run (Thomas kick)	Notre Dame 10-7
3	ND	Bullock 1-yard run (Thomas kick)	Notre Dame 17-7
4	ND	Thomas 42-yard field goal	Notre Dame 20-7

=== Michigan State ===
Team	1	2	3	4	Total
Michigan St.	0	0	3	7	10
• Notre Dame	0	14	0	0	14

- Date: October 6
- Location: Notre Dame Stadium, South Bend, IN
- Game start: 1:30 pm EST
- Game attendance: 59,075
- Game weather: Upper 60s

=== Rice ===
Team	1	2	3	4	Total
• Notre Dame	7	7	7	7	28
Rice	0	0	0	0	0

- Date: October 13
- Location: Rice Stadium, Houston, TX
- Game start: 7:30 p.m. CDT
- Game weather: Hot, humid, drizzle

=== Army ===
Team	1	2	3	4	Total
• Notre Dame	0	28	20	14	62
Army	3	0	0	0	3

- Date: October 20
- Location: Michie Stadium, West Point, New York
- Game start: 2:00 pm
- Game weather: Partly cloudy, 60 degrees

Scoring summary
1	ARMY	Barclay 22-yard field goal	Army 3–0
2	ND	Penick 1-yard run (Thomas kick)	Notre Dame 7–3
2	ND	Casper 34-yard pass from Clements (Thomas kick)	Notre Dame 14–3
2	ND	Best 5-yard run (Thomas kick)	Notre Dame 21–3
2	ND	Casper 3-yard pass from Brown (Thomas kick)	Notre Dame 28–3
3	ND	Penick 6-yard run (Thomas kick)	Notre Dame 35–3
3	ND	Hunter 22-yard run (kick failed)	Notre Dame 41–3
3	ND	Hunter 1-yard run (Thomas kick)	Notre Dame 48–3
4	ND	Allocco 9-yard run (Thomas kick)	Notre Dame 55–3
4	ND	Simon 74-yard punt return (Thomas kick)	Notre Dame 62–3

=== USC ===
Team	1	2	3	4	Total
USC	7	0	7	0	14
• Notre Dame	3	10	10	0	23

- Date: October 27
- Location: Notre Dame Stadium, South Bend, IN
- Game start: 12:50 pm EST
- Game attendance: 59,075
- Game weather: Upper 50s, cloudy, rain
- Referee: Jerry Markbreit (Big Ten)
- TV announcers (ABC): Chris Schenkel, Bud Wilkinson, and Duffy Daugherty

Scoring summary
1	7:08	ND	Thomas 32-yard field goal	ND 3-0
1		USC	Davis 1-yard run (Limahelu kick)	USC 7-3
2	9:34	ND	Thomas 33-yard field goal	USC 7-6
2	0:30	ND	Clements 1-yard run (Thomas kick)	ND 13-7
3		ND	Penick 85-yard run (Thomas kick)	ND 20-7
3		USC	Swann 27-yard pass from Haden (Limahelu kick)	ND 20-14
3		ND	Thomas 32-yard field goal	ND 23-14

=== Navy ===
Navy Midshipmen at Notre Dame Fighting Irish

Quarter	1	2	3	4	Total
Navy	0	0	0	7	7
Notre Dame	7	7	14	16	44

at Notre Dame Stadium, South Bend, IN

- Date: November 3
- Game time: 1:30 pm EST
- Game weather: Partly cloudy, 50 degrees
- Game attendance: 59,075

Game information

Navy

Notre Dame

- Tom Clements
  4/8, 68 Yds
  8 Rush, 66 Yds, TD

Scoring summary

Quarter	Time	Drive			Team	Scoring information	Score	
Quarter	Time	Plays	Yards	TOP	Team	Scoring information	NAVY	ND
1					Notre Dame	Penick 20-yard touchdown run, Thomas kick good	0	7
2					Notre Dame	Hunter 3-yard touchdown run, Thomas kick good	0	14
3					Notre Dame	Clements 1-yard touchdown run, Thomas kick good	0	21
3					Notre Dame	Samuel 7-yard touchdown run, Thomas kick good	0	28
4					Notre Dame	Safety, Glenny tackled in end zone	0	30
4					Navy	Van Loan 25-yard touchdown reception from Glenny, Dykes kick good	7	30
4					Notre Dame	W. Townsend 9-yard touchdown reception from Brown, Thomas kick good	7	37
4					Notre Dame	Parise 3-yard touchdown run, Thomas kick good	7	44
"TOP" = time of possession. For other American football terms, see Glossary of American football.							7	44

=== Pittsburgh ===
Team	1	2	3	4	Total
• Notre Dame	7	3	7	14	31
Pittsburgh	0	3	0	7	10

- Date: November 10
- Location: Pitt Stadium, Pittsburgh, PA
- Game start: 1:30 p.m. EST
- Game attendance: 56,593
- Game weather: Mid-30s, snow flurries
- Referee: Bob Van Lengen

=== Air Force ===
This is the only Thanksgiving Day game ever played at Notre Dame Stadium, and with students away on a week-long break, it also was the only official non-sellout for a Fighting Irish home football game between October 24, 1964, and November 16, 2019.

Team	1	2	3	4	Total
Air Force	0	6	3	6	15
• Notre Dame	28	6	0	14	48

- Date: November 22
- Location: Notre Dame Stadium, South Bend, IN
- Game start: 1:20 pm EST
- Game attendance: 57,236
- Game weather: Sunny, low 60s
- Television network: ABC

=== Miami (FL) ===
Team	1	2	3	4	Total
• Notre Dame	7	17	14	6	44
Miami	0	0	0	0	0

- Date: December 1
- Location: Miami Orange Bowl
- Game start: 7:33 p.m. EST
- Game attendance: 41,047–42,968
- Game weather: 70 degrees, humid
- Referee: Morris Harrison

=== Sugar Bowl vs. Alabama ===
1973 Sugar Bowl

Team	1	2	3	4	Total
• Notre Dame	6	8	7	3	24
Alabama	0	10	7	6	23

- Date: December 31
- Location: Tulane Stadium, New Orleans, LA
- Game start: 7:00 p.m. CST
- Game attendance: 85,161
- Game weather: Light rain, low 50s
- Referee: Gene Calhoun
- TV announcers (ABC): Chris Schenkel, Bud Wilkinson, and Howard Cosell

Scoring summary
1	11:41	ND	Bullock 1-yard run (kick failed)	ND 6-0
2		ALA	Billingsley 6-yard run (Davis kick)	ALA 7-6
2		ND	Hunter 93-yard kickoff return (Clements to Demmerle pass)	ND 14-7
2		ALA	Davis 39-yard field goal	ND 14-10
3		ALA	Jackson 5-yard run (Davis kick)	ALA 17-14
3		ND	Penick 12-yard run (Thomas kick)	ND 21-17
4	9:39	ALA	Todd 25-yard pass from Stock (kick failed)	ALA 23-21
4	4:26	ND	Thomas 19-yard field goal	ND 24-23

== Roster ==
1973 Notre Dame Fighting Irish football team roster
Players
Coaches
Offense

Pos.	#	Name	Class
QB	12	Frank Allocco	Jr
C	52	Joe Alvarado	Jr
RB	23	Art Best	So
G	62	Tom Bolger	Sr
C	59	Mark Brenneman
QB	8	Cliff Brown	Sr
FB	30	Wayne Bullock	Jr
TE	86	Dave Casper	Sr
QB	2	Tom Clements	Jr
WR	85	Peter Demmerle	Jr
RB	28	Gary Diminick	Sr
G	72	Gerry DiNardo	Jr
TE	93	Tom Fine
RB	21	Ron Goodman
RB	25	Al Hunter	Fr
C	52	Vince Klees
FB	15	Russ Kornman
OT	58	Tom Laney
OT	84	Dennis Lozzi	Sr
G	57	Elton Moore
G	66	Dan Morrin
OT	64	Steve Neece	Jr
FB	36	Tom Parise
RB	44	Eric Penick
G	56	Frank Pomarico
OT	77	Steve Quehl
RB	24	Al Samuel	So
WR	28	Tim Simon
OT	71	Steve Sylvester	Jr
WR	80	Willie Townsend	Sr
TE	91	Robin Weber
G	66	Al Wujciak	So

Defense

Pos.	#	Name	Class
DT	79	Jay Achterhoff	So
CB	14	Reggie Barnett	Jr
S	20	Luther Bradley	Fr
DE	89	Ross Browner	Fr
LB	50	Greg Collins	Jr
DE	41	Tom Creevey
DT	88	Mike Fanning	Jr
DE	94	Willie Fry	Fr
DT	95	George Hayduk
DB		Mike Kemp	Jr
CB	26	Tom Lopienski	So
LB	45	Drew Mahalic	So
CB	25	Mike Naughton
DT	70	Steve Niehaus	So
DT	60	Kevin Nosbusch	Jr
DT	96	John Galanis	So
LB	38	Tony Novakov
S	33	Mike Parker
LB	40	Gary Potempa
CB	7	Tim Rudnick	Sr
CB	29	Pat Sarb	So
LB	55	Sherm Smith
DE	48	Jim Stock	So
LB	42	Tim Sullivan	Sr
S	27	Mike Townsend	Sr
LB	61	Mike Webb
S	34	Bob Zanot	So

Special teams

Pos.	#	Name	Class
P	4	Tony Brantley
P	9	Brian Doherty	Sr
K	98	Bob Thomas	Sr

Head coach

- Ara Parseghian

Coordinators/assistant coaches

- Greg Blache (JV)
- Brian Boulac (OL)
- Bill Hickey (OL)
- George Kelly (LB)
- Wally Moore (OL)
- John Murph (Scouting/Def. Asst)
- Tom Pagna (RB)
- Paul Shoults (DB)
- Mike Stock (WR)
- Joe Yonto (DC)

Legend

- (C) Team captain
- (S) Suspended
- (I) Ineligible
- Injured
- Redshirt

== Award winners ==
All-Americans
Name	AP	UPI	NEA	FC	SN	FW	T	FN	WCF
Dave Casper, TE	2	1	1	1		1			1
† Mike Townsend, DB	1	1	1		1	1	1	1	1
†denotes consensus selection

== 1974 NFL draft ==
Player	Position	Round	Pick	Franchise
Dave Casper	Tight End	2(19)	45	Oakland Raiders
Mike Townsend	Defensive Back	4(8)	86	Minnesota Vikings
Brian Doherty	Punter	9(18)	226	Buffalo Bills
Tim Rudnick	Defensive Back	11(5)	265	Baltimore Colts
Frank Pomarico	Guard	14(15)	353	Kansas City Chiefs
Robert R. Thomas	Kicker	15(24)	388	Los Angeles Rams
Cliff Brown	Running Back	17(11)	427	Philadelphia Eagles
Willie Townsend	Wide Receiver	17(24)	440	Los Angeles Rams
