= List of NCAA institutions on probation =

The following is a list of NCAA institutions on probation, organized by division. Probation decisions are made by the National Collegiate Athletic Association's Committee on Infractions.

== Division I FBS institutions on probation ==
The following Division I Football Bowl Subdivision institutions are currently on probation by the NCAA in one or more sports:

Institution	Sport(s)	Expiration date
University of Alabama	Baseball	January 31, 2027
Virginia Polytechnic Institute and State University	Football, cross-country, men's indoor and outdoor track & field	February 12, 2027
University of Iowa	Football	April 13, 2027
University of Memphis	Men's basketball, softball	July 15, 2027
United States Air Force Academy	Men's golf, men's ice hockey	September 11, 2027
Central Michigan University	Football	October 29, 2027
Arizona State University	Football	April 14, 2028
University of Southern Mississippi	Men's tennis	June 17, 2028
Oklahoma State University	Women's tennis	July 1, 2028
University of Tennessee	Football	July 13, 2028
Michigan State University	Football	September 24, 2028
University of Michigan	Football	April 9, 2031

== Division I FCS institutions on probation ==
The following Division I FCS institutions are currently on probation by the NCAA in one or more sports:

Institution	Sport(s)	Expiration date
University of North Dakota	Football	June 4, 2027
Hampton University	Twelve sports (Note: Sports specifically mentioned in the NCAA infractions decision were men's and women's basketball, men's and women's cross country, football, men's lacrosse, men's and women's track & field, men's and women's tennis, softball, and women's volleyball.)	December 17, 2027
Fordham University	Men's basketball	April 21, 2028
Western Illinois University	Women's basketball	December 10, 2028
Long Island University	33 of 35 sports	May 3, 2029

== Division I non-football institutions on probation ==
The following Division I non-football institutions are currently on probation by the NCAA in one or more sports:

Institution	Sport(s)	Expiration date
High Point University	Women's volleyball	February 20, 2027
Florida Gulf Coast University	Men's tennis	April 24, 2027
California State University, Northridge	Men's basketball	June 19, 2030

== Division II institutions on probation ==
The following Division II institutions are currently on probation by the NCAA in one or more sports:

Institution	Sport(s)	Expiration date
West Chester University	Men's basketball	December 17, 2026
University of Nebraska-Kearney	Football	January 28, 2027
Shepherd University	Entire athletic program	May 13, 2027
West Texas A&M University	Men's and women's track & field, men's and women's cross country	May 21, 2027
Westminster University (Utah)	Men's and women's track & field	June 25, 2027
Fort Lewis College	Eleven sports (Note: Sports specifically mentioned in the NCAA infractions decision were football, men's and women's cross country, men's golf, men's and women's soccer, men's and women's indoor/outdoor track & field, and women's lacrosse.)	July 8, 2027
King University	Men's and women's volleyball	October 10, 2027
Quincy University	17 of 24 sports (Note: Sports specifically mentioned in the NCAA infractions decision were women's basketball, men's lacrosse, and men's and women's soccer.)	December 17, 2027

== Division III institutions on probation ==
The following Division III institution is currently on probation by the NCAA in one or more sports:

Institution	Sport(s)	Expiration date
State University of New York at Old Westbury	Women's basketball	December 10, 2026
University of Lynchburg	Entire athletic program	January 22, 2027
Eastern Connecticut State University	Softball	February 26, 2027

== See also ==
- Death penalty (NCAA)
