= Ara Parseghian =

American football player and coach (1923–2017)

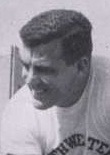
- Parseghian with Northwestern in 1956

Biographical details
- Born: May 21, 1923; Akron, Ohio, U.S.
- Died: August 2, 2017 (aged 94); Granger, Indiana, U.S.

Playing career
- 1946–1947: Miami (OH)
- 1948–1949: Cleveland Browns
- Positions: Halfback, defensive back

Coaching career (HC unless noted)
- 1950: Miami (OH) (assistant)
- 1951–1955: Miami (OH)
- 1956–1963: Northwestern
- 1964–1974: Notre Dame

Head coaching record
- Overall: 170–58–6
- Bowls: 3–2

Accomplishments and honors

Championships
- 2 National (1966, 1973); 2 MAC (1954–1955)

Awards
- AFCA Coach of the Year (1964); Eddie Robinson Coach of the Year (1964); Washington Touchdown Club Coach of the Year (1964); Columbus Touchdown Club Coach of the Year (1964); 2× Football News Coach of the Year (1964, 1973); Sporting News Coach of the Year (1966); Amos Alonzo Stagg Award (1997)
- College Football Hall of Fame; Inducted in 1980 (profile)

Ara Raoul Parseghian (/ˈærə pɑːrˈsiːɡiən/; Armenian: Արա Ռաուլ Բարսեղեան; May 21, 1923 – August 2, 2017) was an American football coach and player who coached the University of Notre Dame to national championships in 1966 and 1973. He is noted for bringing Notre Dame's Fighting Irish football program back from years of futility into national prominence in 1964 and is regarded alongside Knute Rockne and Frank Leahy as a part of the "Holy Trinity" of Notre Dame head coaches.

Parseghian grew up in Akron, Ohio, and played football beginning in his junior year of high school. He enrolled at the University of Akron, but soon quit to join the U.S. Navy for two years during World War II. After the war, he finished his college career at Miami University in Ohio and went on to play halfback for the Cleveland Browns of the All-America Football Conference in 1948 and 1949. Cleveland won the league championship both of those years.

Parseghian's playing career was cut short by a hip injury. He left the Browns and took a job as an assistant coach at Miami University. When head coach Woody Hayes left in 1951 to coach at Ohio State University, Parseghian took over his job. He stayed in that position until 1956, when he was hired as head coach at Northwestern University in Illinois. In eight seasons there, he amassed a win-loss-tie record of 36–35–1 and helped turn a perennial loser into a consistent contender in the national polls.

Parseghian's success attracted the interest of Notre Dame, which had not posted a winning record in five straight seasons. He was hired as head coach in 1964 and quickly turned the program around, coming close to capturing a national championship in his first year. He proceeded to win two national titles in 11 seasons as coach of the Fighting Irish, a period often referred to as "the Era of Ara". During that span, Parseghian's teams placed in the top ten of the final AP poll nine times and never finished lower than 14th. He never had a losing season at Notre Dame and posted an overall record of 95–17–4, giving him the fourth-most wins of any coach in school history after Rockne (105), Brian Kelly (101) and Lou Holtz (100). Parseghian's .836 winning percentage while at Notre Dame ranks behind only Rockne's .881 and Leahy's .855, leading to his inclusion in the "Holy Trinity" of Fighting Irish coaches.

Parseghian retired from coaching in 1974 and began a broadcasting career calling college football games for ABC and CBS. He also dedicated himself to medical causes later in life after his daughter was diagnosed with multiple sclerosis and three of his grandchildren died of a rare genetic disease. Parseghian was inducted into the College Football Hall of Fame as a coach in 1980. His career coaching record is 170–58–6.

== Early life ==
Parseghian was the youngest of three children born to an Armenian father and a French mother in Akron, Ohio. His father Michael had come to the United States from the Ottoman Empire in 1915, fleeing the Armenian genocide during World War I and settling in Akron where there was a sizeable Armenian population. Despite his mother's protectiveness, Parseghian became involved in sports from an early age and developed a reputation as the toughest boy in his class. He was hired by Akron's Board of Education in the eighth grade to patrol his school's grounds at night to deter vandals.

Parseghian played basketball at the local YMCA but did not play organized football until his junior year at South High School in Akron because his mother would not allow him to participate in contact sports. He joined his high school team, coached by Frank "Doc" Wargo, initially without his parents' permission.

== College and professional career ==
After graduating in 1942, Parseghian enrolled at the University of Akron. American involvement in World War II began after the attack on Pearl Harbor in 1941, however, and he quit school to join the U.S. Navy. The Navy transferred him for training to Naval Station Great Lakes near Chicago, where Paul Brown was coaching a service football team. Brown was a well-known high school coach in Ohio, having led his Massillon Washington High School teams to a series of state championships. Parseghian was named the team's starting fullback before the 1944 season, but he was sidelined with an ankle injury and did not play in any games as Great Lakes amassed a 9–2–1 record and was ranked 17th in the nation in the AP Poll. Parseghian later said that despite not playing, watching Brown's methodical and strict coaching methods – and the ease with which he commanded players much larger than he was – was a "priceless" experience.

After his military service, Parseghian enrolled at Miami of Ohio and played halfback on the school's football team in 1946 and 1947 under coach Sid Gillman. As with Brown, Parseghian paid close attention to Gillman, a post-war football pioneer who helped popularize deep downfield passes as the T formation came into vogue. He was named an All-Ohio halfback and a Little All-American by sportswriters in 1947.

Parseghian was selected 109th overall by the Pittsburgh Steelers of the National Football League in the 13th round of the 1947 draft. He was also selected by the Cleveland Browns of the rival All-America Football Conference (AAFC), a team coached by Paul Brown, his old Great Lakes coach. Parseghian left Miami with six semester credit hours remaining and signed with the Browns.

Parseghian played halfback and defensive back for the Browns starting in 1948. While he only started one game that season, he was part of a potent offensive backfield that featured quarterback Otto Graham and fullback Marion Motley. The Browns won all of their games and a third straight AAFC championship in 1948. Parseghian suffered a serious injury to his hip in the second game of the 1949 season against the Baltimore Colts, however, ending his playing career. He stayed with the Browns for the rest of the season, and the team went on to win another AAFC championship. With the Browns, he had 44 carries for 166 yards, three receptions for 33 yards, scored two touchdowns, and intercepted one pass.

== Coaching career ==
=== Miami (Ohio) ===
Parseghian's injury and the end of his professional playing career were a source of frustration, but he soon got the chance to move into the coaching ranks. Woody Hayes, the head coach at Miami of Ohio, contacted him about a job as coach of the freshman team. He was recommended for the position by athletic director John Brickels, who had been an assistant coach with the Browns in 1948. Parseghian led the freshmen to a 4–0 record in the 1950 season and was chosen the following year as Hayes's successor when Hayes departed to become head coach at Ohio State University.

Parseghian's teams at Miami consistently did well in the Mid-American Conference, posting a 7–3 record in 1951 and improving to 8–1 the following year. Miami's Redskins (now known as RedHawks) were conference champions in 1954 and in 1955, when they went undefeated. Parseghian's success, which included two wins over larger Big Ten Conference schools, raised his profile nationally as a head coaching prospect. In late 1955, he was hired to coach at Northwestern University in Evanston, Illinois, one of the Big Ten schools Miami had beaten. Parseghian compiled a 39–6–1 record in five seasons at Miami.

=== Northwestern ===
Northwestern's football program was in transition when Parseghian arrived in 1956 to take over the coaching reins. Bob Voigts had quit as head coach in February 1955, leaving his assistant Lou Saban to guide the team. Under Saban, a former Browns teammate of Parseghian's, Northwestern finished at 0–8–1, the worst-ever record in its history at the time. Ted Payseur, the school's athletic director, resigned after the season under pressure from alumni and was replaced by Stu Holcomb. One of Holcomb's first moves was to fire Saban and replace him with Parseghian.

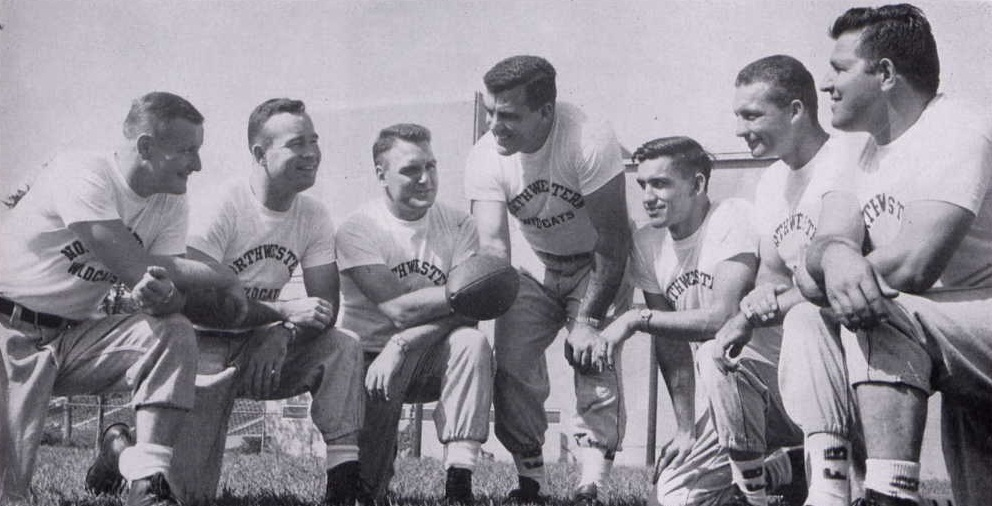
Parseghian (center) and his coaching staff at Northwestern in 1956

Parseghian was the 20th head coach of the Northwestern Wildcats football team and was the youngest coach in the Big Ten when he took the job at 32 years old. His Northwestern career began in 1956 with just one win in his first six games. The Wildcats put together three wins at the end of the season, however, and finished with a 4–4–1 record. Northwestern proceeded to lose all nine of its games in the 1957 season. Bo Schembechler—a member of the 1957 Northwestern staff and teammate of Parsegian's at Miami—called Parsegian's performance during the 1957 season the best job of coaching Schembechler ever witnessed. Despite the losses (many of them by close margins), Parsegian kept his team united and focused. That crucible set the stage for a much more successful campaign in 1958, when Northwestern finished with a 5–4 record that included victories over conference rivals Michigan and Ohio State.

Northwestern began the 1959 season in the top ten in the AP Poll and started with a 45–13 win over Oklahoma, then the top-ranked team in the country. It was the first of a string of victories that propelled Northwestern to the number-two spot in the AP Poll. Led by quarterback John Talley and star halfback Ron Burton, the team beat Michigan again and won a match-up in October against Notre Dame, a school Northwestern had not played since 1948. Three straight losses at the end of the season ended the team's run at the conference championship, however.

The following four seasons brought a mix of success and challenges. Parseghian's best year at Northwestern was in 1962, when the team finished at 7–2. Parseghian was a shrewd recruiter, using Northwestern's small budget to find versatile players overlooked by the bigger rival programs. In 1962, he put his faith in sophomore quarterback Tom Myers to guide the team. Myers, aided by a big offensive line and by star receiver Paul Flatley, led a passing attack that helped Northwestern to the top of the AP Poll in the middle of the season following wins against Ohio State and Notre Dame. Parseghian called the close win against Hayes and Ohio State "one of Northwestern's greatest victories". The following week's Notre Dame game drew a 55,752 people, which remained the largest crowd ever to see a home game at Northwestern as of 2005. Despite those wins, late-season losses to Michigan State and Wisconsin cost the team a chance at the Big Ten championship.

At Northwestern, Parseghian developed a reputation as an affable, down-to-earth coach. While he took his job seriously, he cultivated an informal rapport with players, who called him "Ara" rather than "coach" or "Mr. Parseghian". Given his closeness in age to many of the players, he "empathizes with us well", Northwestern tackle Andy Cvercko said in 1959. Parseghian occasionally joined in practices with the players and organized games of touch football. He had other quirks, like lowering the intensity of practices as game day approached to let the players "build up psychologically", something he learned from Paul Brown.

Parseghian remained at Northwestern for eight seasons until 1963. His career coaching record there was 36–35–1. This ranks him third at Northwestern in total wins and ninth at Northwestern in winning percentage. Parseghian's teams beat Notre Dame four straight times after their annual series was renewed in 1959 following a decade-long hiatus.

Toward the end of his tenure at Northwestern, Parseghian grew frustrated by the school's limited financial resources, curbs on football scholarships, and academic standards for athletes that were more stringent than at other Big Ten schools. He also clashed with athletic director Holcomb, who told him in 1963 that his contract would not be renewed after that season despite coaching the team to within two wins of a national championship the previous year. "I took them to the top of the polls in 1962, and that was not good enough for Northwestern", Parseghian said many years later.

=== Notre Dame ===
Parseghian's coaching career at Northwestern was approaching its end in 1963. In November of that year, he called Father Edmund Joyce, the vice president and chairman of the athletics board at Notre Dame, a Catholic university near South Bend, Indiana. He asked whether interim head football coach Hugh Devore was going to be given the job on a longer-term basis. When Joyce said the university was searching for a new coach, Parseghian expressed an interest in the job. Joyce did not immediately seem warm to the idea, however, and Parseghian explored an offer to coach at the University of Miami in Florida, where his old friend Andy Gustafson had been promoted from head coach to athletic director. Notre Dame was also considering Dan Devine for its coaching job but ultimately offered it to Parseghian. Parseghian waffled at first, recalling his father's misguided anti-Catholicism, but accepted in December and was given a salary of about $20,000 a year ($210,326 today).

Parseghian's candidacy for the head coaching job at Notre Dame was unusual because he was not a Notre Dame graduate, as every head coach since Knute Rockne had been. Parseghian was also an Armenian Presbyterian, making him the first non-Catholic coach since Rockne, who converted in 1925. Before hiring Parseghian, Joyce made it clear that he did not care about Parseghian's religion but simply wanted someone who could lead the football team to success.

As had been the case at Northwestern, Notre Dame's football program was in a state of flux when Parseghian arrived. Notre Dame had built a proud history under Rockne and Frank Leahy (its two most successful coaches), but the late 1950s and early 1960s had been a disaster. The team had finished 5–5 in 1962 under Joe Kuharich, who lost the confidence of his players and Notre Dame's administrators during his four years as coach. Kuharich's surprise departure at the end of that season to become supervisor of officials in the National Football League, a position created by his friend and NFL commissioner Pete Rozelle, left the program in disarray. Devore, a long-time Notre Dame employee who had played for Rockne and coached under Leahy, was brought in to lead the team on an interim basis in 1963. Notre Dame managed only a 2–7 finish that year.

==== Turnaround and the 1964 season ====
Parseghian quickly turned the program around in 1964; he re-established a sense of confidence and team spirit that had been lost under Kuharich and Devore. Practices were carefully planned and organized with the help of a coaching staff that consisted of three assistants from Northwestern and four former Notre Dame players. Parseghian listened to players' concerns about the program and addressed them. He invigorated the team's offense by favoring passing and bringing in smaller and quicker players. A rule change allowing unlimited substitutions starting in 1964 helped make this strategy successful; fast-running receivers could now be taken out of the game and rested as others replaced them.

Parseghian also recognized talent in quarterback John Huarte and wide receiver Jack Snow, who had been used only sparingly for two seasons by previous coaches. Huarte could throw far and accurately but was soft-spoken, a trait Parseghian and his staff helped change. Snow was large for a receiver of his era, but Parseghian thought his athleticism and sure hands would make him a good wideout. Still, expectations were muted for the 1964 season: Parseghian told his coaches that the team would have a 6–4 record if they were lucky. Sports Illustrated predicted a 5–5 record at best, and the team did not rank among the top 20 programs in the country in the pre-season AP Poll.

Notre Dame nonetheless opened the season with a 31–7 victory over heavily favored Wisconsin, a game in which Huarte threw for more yards than the team's leading passer had over the entire 1963 season. Notre Dame players carried Parseghian off the field after the win, which vaulted the team to ninth place in the polls. A string of victories followed, first against Purdue and then Air Force and UCLA. Notre Dame rose to first place in the national polls following a 40–0 win over Navy in October. The team went undefeated until the last game of the year against USC, who won 20–17 in the final minutes on a touchdown pass from Craig Fertig to Rod Sherman. The loss unseated Notre Dame from the top ranking in the national polls, but the team still won the MacArthur Trophy, a championship awarded by the National Football Foundation.

Huarte passed for 2,062 yards and set 12 school records in 1964, four of which still stood as of 2009. He also won the Heisman Trophy. Snow led the country in receptions with 60. At the same time, Parseghian won numerous coach of the year awards for engineering the turnaround, including from the American Football Coaches Association, the Football Writers Association of America, the Washington Touchdown Club, the Columbus Touchdown Club, and Football News.

Huarte and Snow graduated after the 1964 season, and Notre Dame felt their absence the following year, posting a 7–2–1 record. While the team did not contend for a national title, defensive back Nick Rassas led the nation in punt returns and came in sixth in interceptions; he was named a first-team All-American by sportswriters.

==== First national title ====
In 1966, Parseghian guided Notre Dame to its first national championship since the Leahy era. Led by quarterback Terry Hanratty, running back Nick Eddy, star receiver Jim Seymour, and fullback Larry Conjar, the offense was best in the nation in scoring, with an average of 36.2 points per game. The defense was second in the country in points allowed, thanks to strong performances by linebacker Jim Lynch and defensive end Alan Page.

The season began with eight straight victories, propelling Notre Dame to the top of the national polls. The team then faced Michigan State, which was ranked second in the polls and was also undefeated. The contest, one among a number referred to as the "game of the century", ended in a 10–10 tie. Parseghian was criticized for winding down the clock instead of trying to score despite having the ball in the final seconds of the game. He defended his strategy by maintaining that several key starters had been knocked out of action early in the game and that he did not want to spoil a courageous comeback from a 10–0 deficit by risking a turnover deep in his own territory late in the game. When Parseghian's team trounced USC 51–0 the following week, critics alleged that he ran up the score to impress poll voters who had split the number-one ranking between Notre Dame and Michigan State following the tie. Subsequent to the USC rout, the final wire service polls gave Parseghian's team the national championship, although Notre Dame continued its policy of not participating in a post-season bowl game. Nine members of the team were selected as All-Americans, and Parseghian was named coach of the year by Sporting News.

Several winning seasons followed, but Notre Dame did not repeat as national champion in the late 1960s. In 1969, the team finished with an 8–2–1 record and accepted an invitation to play in the postseason Cotton Bowl. With this game, the school ended a long-standing policy of not playing in bowl games. The university urgently needed money to fund minority scholarships and decided to use the proceeds from bowl games for this purpose. Parseghian's team lost the game, 21–17, to the eventual national champion Texas Longhorns.

Statue of Parseghian being carried off the field by his players after beating the Texas Longhorns in the 1971 Cotton Bowl, dedicated September 22, 2007

==== Later Notre Dame career ====
Notre Dame continued to succeed under Parseghian in the early 1970s. Led by senior quarterback Joe Theismann, the team finished second in the polls in 1970 and avenged its Cotton Bowl loss, defeating the Longhorns 24–11 in an upset. In 1973, Parseghian had a perfect season and won a second national championship, topped off by a 24–23 win over Alabama in the Sugar Bowl. Both teams were undefeated going into the game, but Alabama had held the top spot in the national polls. Parseghian was named Coach of the Year by Football News.

Before the start of the 1974 season, several key defensive players were suspended for allegations of sexual misconduct, but charges were never filed. Parseghian called the loss of those key defensive players "a great disappointment". Several other key players were injured. An upset loss to underdog Purdue in the third game of the season derailed the team's hopes to repeat as national champions. The ever-present pressure to win took its toll. In the middle of the season, Parseghian privately decided to resign for the sake of his health. He was also dealing with the deaths of three close friends that year as well as his daughter's battle with multiple sclerosis. He officially stepped down in mid-December after rumors began to surface that he was leaving for a post with another college program or professional team. He said he was "physically exhausted and emotionally drained" after 25 years of coaching and needed a break. His last game was Notre Dame's 13–11 win in a rematch against Alabama in the Orange Bowl. After 11 seasons as head coach of the Fighting Irish, he was succeeded by Dan Devine. His record at Notre Dame was 95–17–4, giving him the second-most wins by any football coach in the school's history, trailing only Knute Rockne.

Parseghian, who was 51 at the time, said he planned to take at least a year off from coaching before considering a run at a job in the professional ranks. Rumors circulated throughout 1975 that he might return to Notre Dame, but both he and Devine denied them. In December, he finally decided that he would not coach in 1976 despite reportedly being pursued by the New York Jets of the NFL. He would instead host a television show beginning the following fall. He made his last appearance on the sidelines when he coached the college players in the annual Chicago College All-Star Game against the defending Super Bowl champion Pittsburgh Steelers on July 23, 1976, at Chicago's Soldier Field. The game was halted with 1:22 remaining in the third quarter when a torrential thunderstorm broke out; after fans rushed onto the field, play was never resumed. It was the last such game ever played.

During Parseghian's tenure at Notre Dame, the school's long-dormant football rivalry with Michigan was revived through an agreement signed in 1970. The schools, which had not met since 1943, agreed to resume the series with the 1978 season. Notre Dame athletic director Moose Krause orchestrated the deal with Don Canham, his counterpart at Michigan, but Parseghian's friendship with Wolverine head coach Bo Schembechler also played a role. Parseghian and Schembechler were teammates at Miami University in Ohio, and Schembechler served on Parseghian's staff at Northwestern in 1956 and 1957. Schembechler told Parseghian in 1970 that he was looking forward to facing Notre Dame, but Parseghian replied that he would "never have that opportunity".

While at Notre Dame, Parseghian did away with all ornamentation on players' uniforms, eliminating shamrocks and shoulder stripes and switched the team's home jerseys to navy blue. The Irish never wore green jerseys during his tenure. His successful run at Notre Dame is sometimes referred to as the "Era of Ara".

== Later life ==
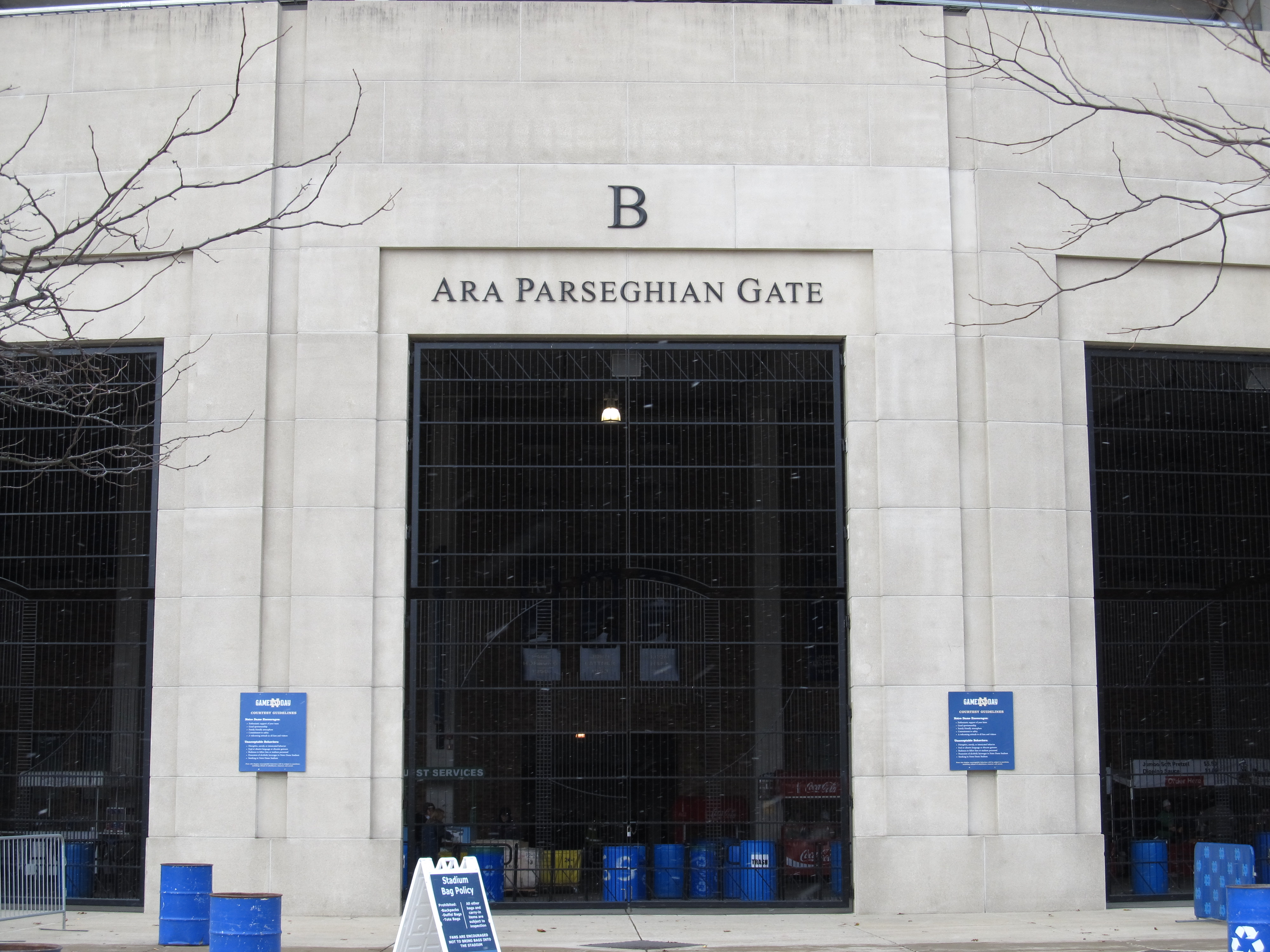
Gate at Notre Dame Stadium named after Parseghian

Parseghian launched a broadcasting career after leaving Notre Dame. He served as a color analyst for ABC Sports from 1975 to 1981 covering a series of regional and national college football games. He moved to CBS Sports in 1982 and covered college games for that network until 1988.

Parseghian, who amassed a career coaching record of 170–58–6 at Miami, Northwestern and Notre Dame, was inducted into the College Football Hall of Fame in 1980. He was inducted into the Miami University Athletic Hall of Fame as part of its charter class in 1969 and became a member of the Indiana Football Hall of Fame in 1984. He was also inducted into the Cotton Bowl Classic Hall of Fame in 2007. Parseghian was awarded an honorary doctorate in humanities by Miami in 1978 and served on the school's board of trustees between 1978 and 1987. He also received an honorary degree from Notre Dame in 1997 and won the Amos Alonzo Stagg Award the same year for his contributions to the sport.

Jason Miller portrayed Parseghian in the 1993 film Rudy, which chronicled Rudy Ruettiger's determination to overcome his small size and dyslexia and play for Notre Dame in 1974. Parseghian saw Ruettiger's drive and placed him on the scout team but resigned at the end of the year. Devine, Parseghian's successor, put Ruettiger in on defense at the end of the final game of the 1975 season, and Ruettiger recorded a sack.

Along with Lou Holtz, Parseghian served as one of two honorary coaches in Notre Dame's 2007 spring game, an annual scrimmage held in April. Holtz's Gold team defeated Parseghian's Blue team, 10–6. The same year, Notre Dame unveiled a statue in Parseghian's honor by sculptor Jerry McKenna, depicting players carrying him off the field in triumph following the 1971 Cotton Bowl victory over Texas; the statue as of 2024 is next to Notre Dame Stadium at Gate B, which is also called the Ara Parseghian Gate. In 2011, Miami also unveiled a statue in his honor to add to the RedHawks' Cradle of Coaches plaza. It shows him wearing a Notre Dame sweater as he kneels and looks ahead to the field.

Parseghian, who was married to the former Kathleen Davis, also became involved with medical causes later in life. Along with Mike and Cindy Parseghian, his son and daughter-in-law, he founded the Ara Parseghian Medical Research Foundation in 1994. The foundation is seeking a cure for Niemann-Pick disease Type C, a genetic disorder affecting children that causes the buildup of cholesterol in cells, resulting in damage to the nervous system and eventually death. Three of his grandchildren, Michael, Marcia, and Christa Parseghian, died from the disease. He was also active in the cause to find a cure for multiple sclerosis; his daughter Karan was diagnosed with the disease.

Parseghian died on August 2, 2017, surrounded by his family at his home in Granger, Indiana, at the age of 94. At the time of his death, he was suffering from an infection that had settled into his hip. He was buried in the Cedar Grove Cemetery in Notre Dame, Indiana.

== Head coaching record ==
Year	Team	Overall	Conference	Standing	Bowl/playoffs	Coaches^{#}	AP^{°}
Miami Redskins (Mid-American Conference) (1951–1955)
1951	Miami	7–3	3–1	2nd			
1952	Miami	8–1	4–1	2nd			
1953	Miami	7–1–1	3–0–1	2nd			
1954	Miami	8–1	4–0	1st			
1955	Miami	9–0	5–0	1st		20	15
Miami:		39–6–1	19–2–1				
Northwestern Wildcats (Big Ten Conference) (1956–1963)
1956	Northwestern	4–4–1	3–3–1	6th			
1957	Northwestern	0–9	0–7	10th			
1958	Northwestern	5–4	3–4	7th		17	
1959	Northwestern	6–3	4–3	5th			
1960	Northwestern	5–4	3–4	T–5th			
1961	Northwestern	4–5	3–4	T–7th			
1962	Northwestern	7–2	4–2	3rd		16	
1963	Northwestern	5–4	3–4	T–5th			
Northwestern:		36–35–1	22–31–1				
Notre Dame Fighting Irish (NCAA University Division / Division I independent) (1964–1974)
1964	Notre Dame	9–1				3	3
1965	Notre Dame	7–2–1				8	9
1966	Notre Dame	9–0–1				1	1
1967	Notre Dame	8–2				4	5
1968	Notre Dame	7–2–1				8	5
1969	Notre Dame	8–2–1			L Cotton	9	5
1970	Notre Dame	10–1			W Cotton	5	2
1971	Notre Dame	8–2				15	13
1972	Notre Dame	8–3			L Orange	12	14
1973	Notre Dame	11–0			W Sugar	4*	1
1974	Notre Dame	10–2			W Orange	4	6
Notre Dame:		95–17–4					
Total:		170–58–6					
National championship Conference title Conference division title or championship game berth
^{#}Rankings from final Coaches Poll.; ^{°}Rankings from final AP Poll.

*Note: before the 1974 season, the final Coaches Poll, also known then as the UPI Poll, was released before the bowl games, so a team that lost its bowl game could still claim the UPI national championship. This was changed as a result of Alabama winning the 1973 Coaches Poll national championship despite losing to Notre Dame in the Sugar Bowl.

== Coaching tree ==
Assistants under Parseghian who became college or professional head coaches:

- John Pont: Miami (OH) (1956–1962), Yale Bulldogs (1963–1964), Indiana Hoosiers (1965–1972), Northwestern Wildcats (1973–1977), Mount St. Joseph Lions (1990–1992)
- Alex Agase: Northwestern Wildcats (1964–1972), Purdue Boilermakers (1973–1976)
- Bo Schembechler: Miami (OH) (1963–1968), Michigan (1969–1989)
- Warren Schmakel: Boston University Terriers (1964–1968)
- Doc Urich: Buffalo Bulls (1966–1968), Northern Illinois (1969–1970)
- Jerry Wampfler: Colorado State Rams (1970–1972)
- Ed Chlebek: Eastern Michigan Hurons (1976–1978), Boston College Eagles (1978–1980), Kent State Golden Flashes (1981–1982)
- John Ray: Kentucky Wildcats (1969–1972)

Awards and achievements
Preceded by Zhou Enlai & Alexei Kosygin	Cover of Time magazine November 20, 1964	Succeeded by Lammot Copeland
