= 1974 Notre Dame Fighting Irish football team =

American college football season

1974 Notre Dame Fighting Irish football

Orange Bowl champion

Orange Bowl, W 13–11 vs. Alabama
- Conference: Independent

Ranking
- Coaches: No. 4
- AP: No. 6
- Record: 10–2
- Head coach: Ara Parseghian (11th season)
- Base defense: 4–3
- Captains: Tom Clements; Greg Collins
- Home stadium: Notre Dame Stadium

1974 NCAA Division I independents football records
| | Conf. | | | Overall |
| Team | W | L | T | W | | L | | T |
|---|---|---|---|---|---|---|---|---|
| No. 6 Notre Dame | | – | | 10 | – | 2 | – | 0 |
| No. 7 Penn State | | – | | 10 | – | 2 | – | 0 |
| Temple | | – | | 8 | – | 2 | – | 0 |
| Boston College | | – | | 8 | – | 3 | – | 0 |
| Utah State | | – | | 8 | – | 3 | – | 0 |
| No. 19 Houston | | – | | 8 | – | 3 | – | 1 |
| Rutgers | | – | | 7 | – | 3 | – | 1 |
| Cincinnati | | – | | 7 | – | 4 | – | 0 |
| Memphis State | | – | | 7 | – | 4 | – | 0 |
| Pittsburgh | | – | | 7 | – | 4 | – | 0 |
| Georgia Tech | | – | | 6 | – | 5 | – | 0 |
| Hawaii | | – | | 6 | – | 5 | – | 0 |
| Miami (FL) | | – | | 6 | – | 5 | – | 0 |
| Southern Miss | | – | | 6 | – | 5 | – | 0 |
| Tampa | | – | | 6 | – | 5 | – | 0 |
| Holy Cross | | – | | 5 | – | 5 | – | 1 |
| Tulane | | – | | 5 | – | 6 | – | 0 |
| Colgate | | – | | 4 | – | 6 | – | 0 |
| Northern Illinois | | – | | 4 | – | 7 | – | 0 |
| Navy | | – | | 4 | – | 7 | – | 0 |
| South Carolina | | – | | 4 | – | 7 | – | 0 |
| Virginia Tech | | – | | 4 | – | 7 | – | 0 |
| West Virginia | | – | | 4 | – | 7 | – | 0 |
| Army | | – | | 3 | – | 8 | – | 0 |
| Dayton | | – | | 3 | – | 8 | – | 0 |
| Villanova | | – | | 3 | – | 8 | – | 0 |
| Air Force | | – | | 2 | – | 9 | – | 0 |
| Southern Illinois | | – | | 2 | – | 9 | – | 0 |
| Syracuse | | – | | 2 | – | 9 | – | 0 |
| Florida State | | – | | 1 | – | 10 | – | 0 |
| Marshall | | – | | 1 | – | 10 | – | 0 |
Rankings from AP Poll

The 1974 Notre Dame Fighting Irish football team was an American football team that represented the University of Notre Dame as an independent during the 1974 NCAA Division I football season. In their tenth and final year under head coach Ara Parseghian, the Irish compiled a 10–2 record, outscored opponents by a total of 305 to 136, and were ranked No. 6 in the final AP poll and No. 4 in the final UPI poll. In three games against ranked opponents, they defeated No. 17 Pittsburgh, lost to No. 6 USC, and defeated No. 2 Alabama in the Orange Bowl.

Wide receiver Peter Demmerle and offensive guard Gerry DiNardo were consensus first-team picks on the 1974 All-America college football team. Quarterback Tom Clements, defensive end Steve Niehaus, defensive tackle Mike Fanning, and linebacker Greg Collins also received first-team All-America honors from one or more selectors. The team's statistical leaders included Clements (1,549 passing yards, .567 completion percentage), Wayne Bullock (855 rushing yards, 72 points scored), Demmerle (43 receptions for 667 yards), and Collins (144 tackles).

On December 15, 1974, Parseghian resigned as head coach, effective after the Orange Bowl. Parseghian stated that he was "emotionally and physically exhausted" and planned to take at least a year's leave from football. On the same day, Notre Dame announced Green Bay Packers coach Dan Devine as Parseghian's replacement.

The team played its home games at Notre Dame Stadium in Notre Dame, Indiana.

== Schedule ==
| Date | Time | Opponent | Rank | Site | TV | Result | Attendance | Source |
|---|---|---|---|---|---|---|---|---|
| September 9 | 9:00 p.m. | at Georgia Tech | No. 3 | Grant Field; Atlanta, GA (rivalry) | ABC | W 31–7 | 45,228 | |
| September 21 | 2:00 p.m. | at Northwestern | No. 1 | Dyche Stadium; Evanston, IL (rivalry) | | W 49–3 | 55,000 | |
| September 28 | 2:30 p.m. | Purdue | No. 2 | Notre Dame Stadium; Notre Dame, IN (rivalry) | | L 20–31 | 59,075 | |
| October 5 | 1:30 p.m. | at Michigan State | No. 7 | Spartan Stadium; East Lansing, MI (rivalry) | | W 19–14 | 77,431 | |
| October 12 | 2:30 p.m. | Rice | No. 6 | Notre Dame Stadium; Notre Dame, IN | | W 10–3 | 59,075 | |
| October 19 | 2:30 p.m. | Army | No. 7 | Notre Dame Stadium; Notre Dame, IN (rivalry) | | W 48–0 | 59,075 | |
| October 26 | 1:50 p.m. | Miami (FL) | No. 7 | Notre Dame Stadium; Notre Dame, IN (rivalry) | ABC | W 38–7 | 59,075 | |
| November 2 | 1:30 p.m. | vs. Navy | No. 7 | Veterans Stadium; Philadelphia, PA (rivalry) | | W 14–6 | 48,634 | |
| November 16 | 1:30 p.m. | No. 17 Pittsburgh | No. 5 | Notre Dame Stadium; Notre Dame, IN (rivalry) | | W 14–10 | 59,075 | |
| November 23 | 1:30 p.m. | Air Force | No. 5 | Notre Dame Stadium; Notre Dame, IN (rivalry) | | W 38–0 | 59,075 | |
| November 30 | 5:00 p.m. | at No. 6 USC | No. 5 | Los Angeles Memorial Coliseum; Los Angeles, CA (rivalry) | ABC | L 24–55 | 83,522 | |
| January 1, 1975 | 8:00 p.m. | vs. No. 2 Alabama | No. 9 | Miami Orange Bowl; Miami, FL (Orange Bowl) | NBC | W 13–11 | 71,801 | |
Rankings from AP Poll released prior to the game; All times are in Eastern time

== Game summaries ==
=== Georgia Tech ===
The season began as Notre Dame faced Georgia Tech on Monday night national television. Georgia Tech scored first, but the Irish came back to score 31 unanswered points. Wayne Bullock tied it with a 14-yard touchdown run after a Tech fumble. the Fighting Irish took the lead in the second quarter on a 22-yard Dave Reeve field goal and a 7-yard touchdown pass from Tom Clements to Pete Demmerle. in the second half, Bullock scored from the one and Al Samules slashed in from the 8 on a sweep. The national telecast caught a great play when Steve Sylvester blindsided a pursuing Georgia Tech linemen as he Clements on a broken play.

=== Northwestern ===
| Team | 1 | 2 | 3 | 4 | Total |
|---|---|---|---|---|---|
| • Notre Dame | 7 | 7 | 21 | 14 | 49 |
| Northwestern | 0 | 3 | 0 | 0 | 3 |

- Date: September 21
- Location: Dyche Stadium, Evanston, Illinois
- Game attendance: 54,301

Scoring summary
| 1 | ND | Kornman 2 yard run (Reeve kick) | Notre Dame 7–0 |
| 2 | NW | Blazevich 27 yard field goal | Notre Dame 7–3 |
| 2 | ND | Bullock 1 yard run (Reeve kick) | Notre Dame 14–3 |
| 3 | ND | Goodman 62 yard run (Reeve kick) | Notre Dame 21–3 |
| 3 | ND | Weber 14 yard pass from Clements (Reeve kick) | Notre Dame 28–3 |
| 3 | ND | Allocco 1 yard run (Reeve kick) | Notre Dame 35–3 |
| 4 | ND | McLane 11 yard run (Reeve kick) | Notre Dame 42–3 |
| 4 | ND | Eurick 1 yard run (Reeve kick) | Notre Dame 49–3 |

Notre Dame dropped four fumbles in the first half and Northwestern held the Irish to a 14–3 halftime lead. the first Fighting Irish score followed a pass to Demmerle that reached the Northwestern 2; Russ Kornman scored. Bullock scored for the second touchdown after a Northwestern roughing penalty boosted a drive. Ron Goodman ran 62 yards to score on the fourth play of the new half. Clements followed a fumble recovery with a drive and a 14-yard touchdown pass to Robin Weber. Frank Allocco scored a keeper after another fumble. Reserves Mark McLane punched over an 11-yard touchdown and Terry Eurick a two-yarder. Future All-America tight end Ken MacAfee (6'5" and 245 pounds0 made his freshman appearance. Notre Dame won 49–3.

=== Purdue ===
Purdue stopped the Notre Dame winning streak at 13 with a 31–20 victory. The Fighting Irish self-destructed with early fumbles and interceptions. Purdue enjoyed a 21–0 lead after only 11 plays. Their scoring came on a one-yard quarterback keeper around end, a 52-yard scoring sprint, and a 21-yard interception return. Notre Dame shanked a punt and Purdue nailed a 47-yard field goal. Bullock scored early in the second quarter. At the half, the score was 24–7, and Notre Dame had 208 yards to Purdue's 168. Bullock scored on a short run in the third quarter after a busted play. Two scoring opportunities were wasted with loss of possession on downs and an ineligible receiver penalty. Purdue intercepted a pass and made a 6-yard follow-up touchdown. Clements hit Demmerle late with a touchdown pass, too late to change the outcome. The Fighting Irish beat themselves with offensive mistakes, although they outgained Purdue 407 yard to 270.

=== Michigan State ===
The Fighting Irish came back the next week against Michigan State. In the first quarter, Kevin Nosbusch recovered a fumble caused by Jim Stock and Mike Fanning. Clements almost got a touchdown out of a pass play to Weber; Bullock plowed in for the score. The Spartans fumbled at their 10 and Bullock scored on the next play. Reeve made a field goal from 38 yards after a bad Spartan punt. he added a 32-yarder in the last period. The Spartans drove 99 yards for their first touchdown, scored again, but Randy Payne intercepted a pass to kill their last good chance. Bullock ran the ball against MSU 36 times, a new record.

=== Rice ===
Rice, normally a patsy, went down by the surprising score of 10–3. Notre Dame spotted Rice an early field goal and spent the rest of the game searching for their missing offense. In the second quarter, the Fighting Irish were flagged for illegal procedure; a referee claimed the linemen's posteriors were not on the same horizontal plane, within an inch's variance. Ara protested with all he had, only to add to the penalty. After 5 futile drives, Reeve kicked a 45-yard field goal. Rice was kept in check for the rest of the game. in the fourth quarter, Notre Dame used 20 plays to execute an 80-yard drive. Bullock scored from the two around left end.

=== Army ===
Army was again mismatched, 48–0. The game featured an unexpectedly early fall snowstorm. Bullock scored from the six to lead Fighting Irish backs to 525 yards rushing and 30 first downs, a new record. Bullock scored the second touchdown as well. Clements ran a seven-yard keeper before halftime for a touchdown and a 20–0 score. in the third period, Russ Kornman scored twice, form the seven and the four, and Al Samuels went 35 yards on a pitchout to score. Tom Baker scored the same way in the fourth quarter, form the six.

=== Miami ===
Miami was 4–1 and had stars Rubin Carter, Dennis Harrah, and Mike Archer but fell to Notre Dame. Demmerle caught a 53-yard touchdown in the first two minutes of the game. Miami later fumbled on a 69-yard punt, at their nine; Bullock rammed in to score on the next play. Reeve made an 18-yard field goal after MacAfee set him up with a 24-yard pass play. Randy Harrison intercepted a pass and ran it back 44 yards for a touchdown. Clements scored on a keeper from the Miami 8, and MacAfee made a four-yard touchdown catch. Clements was 13 of 19 for 154 yards and two touchdowns.

=== Navy ===
Notre Dame Fighting Irish at Navy Midshipmen

| Quarter | 1 | 2 | 3 | 4 | Total |
|---|---|---|---|---|---|
| Notre Dame | 0 | 0 | 0 | 14 | 14 |
| Navy | 3 | 0 | 3 | 0 | 6 |

at Veterans Stadium • Philadelphia, Pennsylvania

- Notre Dame Football Archives

Game information

Notre Dame

- Tom Clements 5/22, TD, 2 INT

Navy

The 14–6 win over Navy was a turning point in Notre Dame football history; on the flight back from Philadelphia, a weary Ara Parseghian decided he would leave football. He had important family considerations and constant pressure; the fun was gone.

Goodman fumbled a punt early in the game and Navy kicked a field goal. They added another in the second half for a 6–0 lead. The only decent Fighting Irish drive to that point ended in a missed field goal. The defense turned it up, forced a punt, and Goodman took it back to their 28. Surviving a bad snap at the five, Clements found Demmerle for a touchdown. Randy Harrison made an interception and returned it 40 yards for a touchdown.

Scoring summary

| Quarter | Time | Drive | | | Team | Scoring information | Score | |
| Quarter | Time | Plays | Yards | TOP | Team | Scoring information | ND | NAVY |
|---|---|---|---|---|---|---|---|---|
| 1 | | | | | Navy | 49-yard field goal by Steve Dykes | 0 | 3 |
| 3 | | | | | Navy | 37-yard field goal by Steve Dykes | 0 | 6 |
| 4 | | | | | Notre Dame | Pete Demmerle 6-yard touchdown reception from Tom Clements, Dave Reeve kick good | 7 | 6 |
| 4 | 2:12 | | | | Notre Dame | Interception returned 40 yards for touchdown by Randy Harrison, Dave Reeve kick good | 14 | 6 |
| "TOP" = time of possession. For other American football terms, see Glossary of American football. | | | | | | | 14 | 6 |

=== Pittsburgh ===
In their next game, Notre Dame looked proficient on the first possession and Bullock scored from the seven. But then they had to wait until the fourth quarter. in the interim, Pitt kicked a field goal and scored from the one. Notre Dame had stopped a Pitt scoring attempt after a blocked Irish punt—this proved to be the game-saver. With 8 minutes left, and 55 yards away from the goal, Clements used Bullock for 32 yards on line smashes, and hit Demmerle with a 3-yard touchdown pass for the win. Bullock's 25 runs gave him 193 for the year to break Neil Worden's old record.

=== Air Force ===
Kornman, in for an injured Bullock, scored from the one, but Parise got in there with a 62-yard jaunt. Parise scored in the second quarter from the 11, and Clements scored from the nine. Allocco scored on a keeper from the one for a 28-0 halftime score. in the second half, Reeve booted a 33-yard field goal and Allocco hit Kevin Doherty with a 25-yard touchdown pass.

=== USC ===
The Fighting Irish blew a 24–0 lead as USC scored 55 points in a strange game. Drew Mahalic intercepted a Pat Haden pass, and Bullock scored from the two to end the short drive. Clements threw to Demmerle for a touchdown from the USC 29. Reeve hit a field goal, and McLane scored from the nine with a draw play. Anthony Davis scored from the eight with a swing pass for the Trojans, but they missed the point after. Then they hammered Notre Dame for 49 unanswered points in the second half. Davis ran the second-half opening kickoff back 102 yards for a touchdown, scored from the six, and then from the four. John McKay Jr. caught an 18-yard touchdown pass, and also a 44-yarder on the last play of the third quarter. The Fighting Irish fumbled, and Diggs caught a 16-yard touchdown pass on the ensuing possession. A long Clements pass was intercepted and returned 58 yards for the final touchdown, and a 55–24 win for USC. Four of the last five Trojan touchdowns came off Irish turnovers.

=== Orange Bowl ===
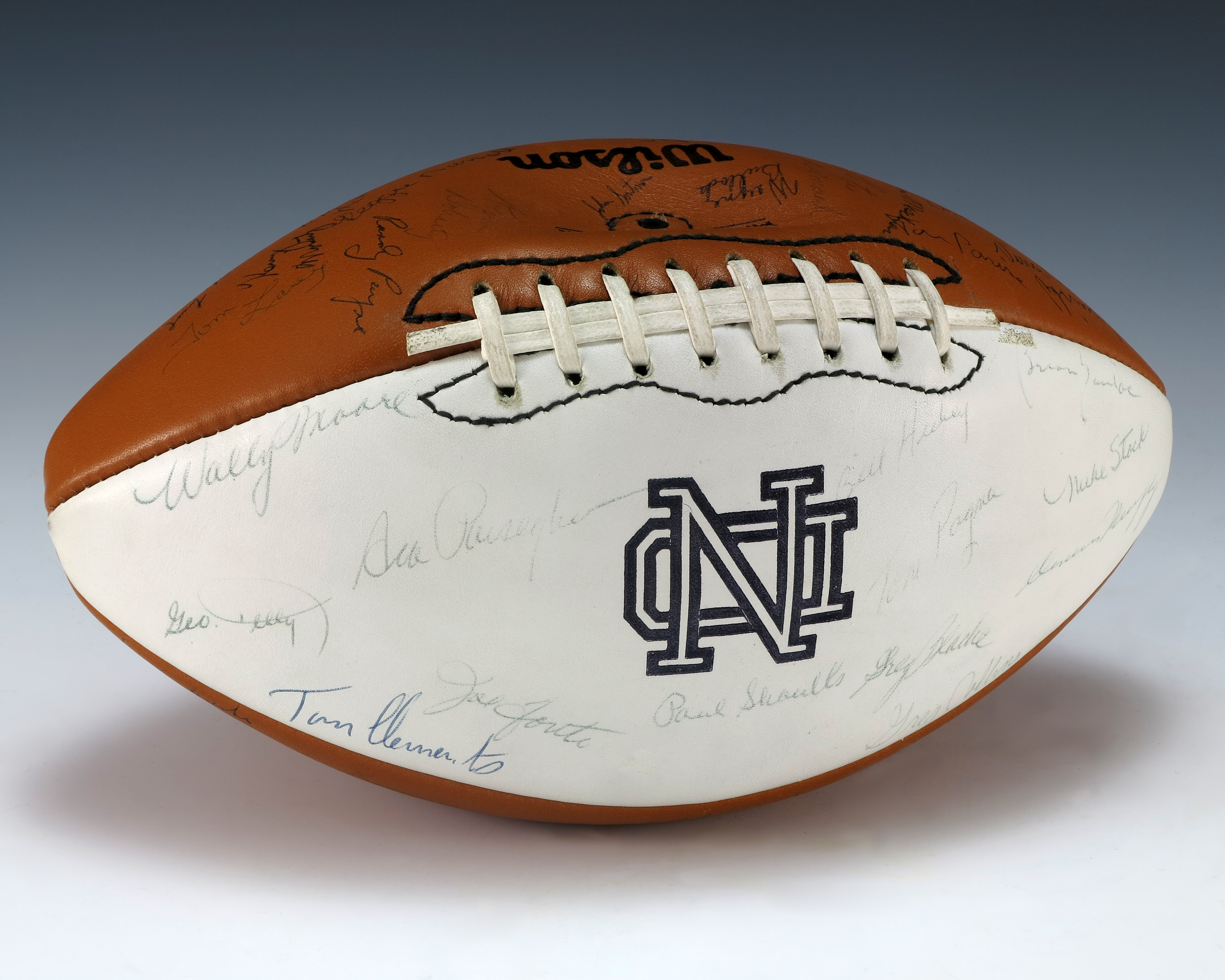
A football signed by the 1974 Notre Dame Fighting Irish football team, including Ken MacAfee, Ara Parseghian, and Tom Clements.

Notre Dame bounced back from its stunning loss at USC to ruin Alabama's perfect season and national championship hopes, in Ara Parseghian's final game as coach. A Crimson Tide fumble at the 16 resulted in a Bullock score from the four. Notre Dame rolled on a long drive, mostly running, and McLane scored from the nine in the second quarter. The point after was missed, and Notre Dame led 13–0. An Irish fumble earned Alabama a field goal, making the halftime score 13–3, Irish. The third quarter was scoreless. The Crimson Tide scored on a 48-yard pass play in the fourth quarter and made a 2-point conversion. The wishbone had foundered on the Notre Dame defense, so Alabama had to pass. It was their undoing. Reggie Barnett intercepted a pass and zigzagged all over the Orange Bowl for the win. The wishbone gained only 62 yards all evening. The Fighting Irish players carried Ara off the field and into history.

== Roster ==
1974 Notre Dame Fighting Irish football team roster
Players
Coaches
Offense

| Pos. | # | Name | Class |
|---|---|---|---|
| QB | 12 | Frank Allocco | Jr |
| OT | 68 | Ed Bauer | Jr |
| TE | 83 | Doug Buth | So |
| QB | 2 | Tom Clements | Sr |
| WR | 85 | Peter Demmerle |
| G | 72 | Gerry DiNardo | Sr |
| FB | 36 | Tom Parise | Jr |
| C | 77 | Steve Quehl | Jr |
| OT | 71 | Steve Sylvester | Sr |

Defense

| Pos. | # | Name | Class |
|---|---|---|---|
| DE | 48 | Jim Stock | Jr |
| LB | 50 | Greg Collins | Sr |
| DT | 88 | Mike Fanning | Sr |
| DB | | Mike Kemp | Sr |
| LB | 45 | Drew Mahalic | Sr |
| DT | 70 | Steve Niehaus | Jr |

Special teams

| Pos. | # | Name | Class |

Head coach

- Ara Parseghian

Coordinators/assistant coaches

Legend

- (C) Team captain
- (S) Suspended
- (I) Ineligible
- Injured
- Redshirt

== 1975 NFL draft ==
| Player | Position | Round | Pick | NFL club |
|---|---|---|---|---|
| Mike Fanning | Defensive tackle | 1 | 9 | Los Angeles Rams |
| Greg Collins | Linebacker | 2 | 36 | San Francisco 49ers |
| Drew Mahalic | Linebacker | 3 | 69 | Denver Broncos |
| Kevin Nosbusch | Defensive tackle | 5 | 111 | San Diego Chargers |
| Wayne Bullock | Running back | 5 | 114 | San Francisco 49ers |
| Steve Sylvester | Tackle | 10 | 259 | Oakland Raiders |
| Peter Demmerle | Wide receiver | 13 | 320 | San Diego Chargers |
| Eric Penick | Running back | 13 | 329 | Denver Broncos |
| Reggie Barnett | Defensive back | 14 | 345 | San Diego Chargers |
| Tom Fine | Tight end | 16 | 408 | Buffalo Bills |
