= 1975 San Diego Chargers season =

1975 NFL team season

- Owner: Eugene V. Klein
- General manager: Harland Svare
- Head coach: Tommy Prothro
- Home stadium: San Diego Stadium

Results
- Record: 2–12
- Division place: 4th AFC West
- Playoffs: Did not qualify
- All-Pros: None
- Pro Bowlers: 1: T Russ Washington

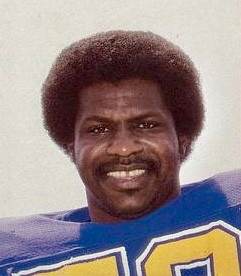
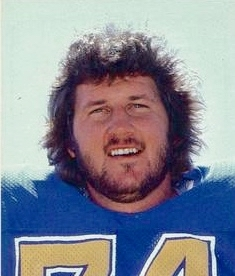
Defensive tackles Gary Johnson (left) and Louie Kelcher (right) were two of the success stories in the Chargers' celebrated 1975 draft class.

The 1975 San Diego Chargers season was the franchise's sixth season in the National Football League (NFL) and its 16th overall. The team were seeking to improve on their 5–9 record in 1974, but they lost their first eleven games amidst home attendances that dipped under 30,000.

San Diego were three losses from the league's first 0–14 season but averted that possibility with a week 12 win in Kansas City. They eventually finished 2–12, tied for the NFL's worst record and representing the worst mark in franchise history until the 2000 team went 1–15. The team suffered badly from injuries, most critically running back Don Woods, who had been AFC Rookie of the Year in 1974 but played only the first five games in this season. Quarterback Dan Fouts had a difficult campaign, throwing only two touchdowns in nine starts.

More positively, the Chargers draft class of 1975 was among their strongest, featuring many future starters. Defensive linemen Gary "Big Hands" Johnson, Louie Kelcher and Fred Dean would go on to form three quarters of San Diego's Bruise Brothers unit, with each of the three being named a first-team All-Pro by the Associated Press at least once during their careers. Other selections included defensive backs Mike Williams and Mike Fuller and tackle Billy Shields, each of whom would start at least 70 games for the Chargers.

== Offseason ==
=== NFL draft ===
While Harland Svare was the Chargers' general manager in 1975, head coach Tommy Prothro is credited as the primary decision-maker when it came to the draft. San Diego's class of 1975 proved to be a success, with ESPN naming it the franchise's best in a 2009 article. Prothro's first selection was Gary "Big Hands" Johnson, a defensive tackle whose pass rushing appealed to Prothro. Johnson would miss only a single game during nine seasons in San Diego, starting the vast majority and accumulating 67 1/2 sacks; he made four Pro Bowls, was an Associated Press first-team All-Pro twice, and was inducted into the Chargers Hall of Fame in 1999.

San Diego had a further first-round pick, as part of the trade that sent Duane Thomas to Washington. With this, they selected cornerback Mike Williams ("as good a coverer as I have ever seen" – Prothro). Williams started every game during his rookie year, and went on to intercept 24 passes in eight seasons with the team.

In the 2nd round, the Chargers again had an extra pick, acquired in the 1973 trade of Bob Babich to Cleveland. This was used to draft Louie Kelcher, a defensive tackle noted for his strength. As a rookie, Kelcher was inserted into a starting role which he retained when injury-free for the bulk of his nine years in San Diego. He would be credited with 40 sacks during his career, appear in three Pro Bowls and be a first-team All-Pro once. In 2003, Kelcher was inducted into the Charger Hall of Fame.

With their following pick (their fourth selection out of the top 33 overall in that year's draft), San Diego selected a third defensive lineman in tackle Fred Dean. Prothro praised Dean's speed and intensity and indicated that he would be switched to linebacker. In the event, Dean played at defensive end throughout his professional career, which was split between San Diego (6 seasons) and San Francisco (5 seasons). Dean, another rookie who would be speedily inserted into the Chargers' defensive line-up, recorded 52 of his 92 career sacks in San Diego, while making two of his four Pro Bowl appearances and being granted the first of his two first-team All-Pro selections. Dean was inducted into the Pro Football Hall of Fame in 2008; later that year, he became the third member of the Chargers' draft class of 1975 to be added to their Hall of Fame.

The Chargers acquired other future starters in the later rounds. Third-round pick Fuller had some success as a kick returner in his rookie season and also saw action as a strong safety. He started all but one game at that position from 1976 to 1979, and spent six years with the team in total. San Diego's first seven picks were all spent on defensive players, but they picked up a key offensive lineman in sixth-rounder Billy Shields. The 6 ft 8 in (2.03 m) tackle made only occasional appearances as a rookie but started 116 out of possible 117 games through the next eight seasons. Another offensive lineman, Ralph Perretta, became the team's long snapper during a six-year career and served as the starting center in 1977. Running back Rickey Young spent the first three of his nine years in the league in San Diego, rushing and receiving for close to 3,000 yards and scoring 15 touchdowns as a Charger.

1975 San Diego Chargers draft
Round	Pick	Player	Position	College	Notes
1	8	Gary Johnson *	Defensive tackle	Grambling St.	
1	22	Mike Williams	Defensive back	LSU	
2	30	Louie Kelcher *	Defensive tackle	SMU	
2	33	Fred Dean ^{†}	Defensive end	Louisiana Tech	
3	73	Mike Fuller	Defensive back	Auburn	
4	101	Ken Bernich	Linebacker	Auburn	
5	111	Kevin Nosbusch	Defensive tackle	Notre Dame	
5	125	Charles Waddell	Tight end	North Carolina	
6	134	John Carroll	Wide receiver	Oklahoma	
6	136	Billy Shields	Tackle	Georgia Tech	
7	164	Rickey Young	Running back	Jackson St.	
8	203	Barry Collier	Tackle	Georgia	
8	206	Ralph Perretta	Center	Purdue	
9	214	Larry Keller	Linebacker	Houston	
10	242	Otha Bradley	Defensive tackle	USC	
11	267	Vince Phason	Defensive back	Arizona	
11	284	Ike McBee	Wide receiver	San Jose St.	
12	292	Jerry Dahl	Linebacker	North Dakota St.	
13	320	Peter Demmerle	Wide receiver	Notre Dame	
13	335	Glen Printers	Running back	Southern Colorado	
14	345	Reggie Barnett	Defensive back	Notre Dame	
15	370	John Roush	Guard	Oklahoma	
16	398	Chip Salvestrini	Guard	Yankton	
17	423	Neal Jeffrey	Quarterback	Baylor	Made roster in 1976
Made roster † Pro Football Hall of Fame * Made at least one Pro Bowl during career

=== Departures ===
A number of veterans left the Chargers during the offseason. Carl Mauck had started 54 games at center out of a possible 56 during four seasons in San Diego but was traded to the Oilers for two other players. Cornerback Bob Howard had been with the team for twice as long, playing in 102 games and starting 85 through 8 seasons. He was traded to the Patriots for a 1976 fifth-round draft choice, which they would spend on Woodrow Lowe.

Other former starters to be traded included running back Cid Edwards and Jerry LeVias (for draft choices), and defensive end Pete Lazetich (for linebacker Bruce Bannon), while wide receiver Harrison Davis, tight end Wayne Stewart, linebacker Carl Gersbach and safety George Hoey were all cut or placed on waivers.

=== Arrivals ===
As well as their new draftees, San Diego also signed a handful of established veterans. Tight end Pat Curran was obtained from the Rams in exchange for a draft pick, which proved to be the Chargers' 3rd round pick in 1977. Curran had been primarily used as a backup to Bob Klein (also a future Charger), making only nine catches in six seasons while starting a single game. He played a much bigger role in the Chargers' passing game, catching 45 passes in his first season alone. The offensive line gained a new center in Ed Flanagan, who joined the team after earning four Pro Bowl appearances during a decade in Detroit Lions. In 1975, he started every game in San Diego. On defense, fourth-year linebacker Tom Graham was acquired and started 28 games over the next three seasons.

== Personnel ==
=== Staff ===
1975 San Diego Chargers staff
Front office: Owner – Gene Klein; General manager – Harland Svare; Head coaches: Head coach – Tommy Prothro; Offensive coaches: Offensive coordinator – John David Crow	Defensive coaches: Defensive coordinator – Jackie Simpson; Linebackers – Dick Coury; Special teams coaches: Special teams – George Dickson

=== Roster ===
1975 San Diego Chargers roster
Quarterbacks (QB): 10 Bobby Douglass; 14 Dan Fouts; 17 Jesse Freitas; Running backs (RB): 28 Dave Atkins; 35 Tony Baker; 21 Glen Bonner; 41 Bo Matthews; 30 Sam Scarber; 34 Rickey Young; Wide receivers (WR): 27 Gary Garrison; 89 Dwight McDonald; 83 Joe Sweet; Tight ends (TE): 88 Chuck Bradley; 82 Pat Curran	Offensive linemen (OL): 65 Booker Brown T; 54 Ed Flanagan C; 69 Ira Gordon G; 56 Mark Markovich C; 61 Ralph Perretta G; 66 Billy Shields T; 70 Russ Washington T; 63 Doug Wilkerson G; Defensive linemen (DL): 79 Coy Bacon DE; 71 Fred Dean DE; 74 Louie Kelcher DT; 72 Gary Johnson DT; 75 Dave Tipton DE; 68 Greg Wojcik DT	Linebackers (LB): 51 Billy Andrews OLB; 50 Don Goode OLB; 58 Tom Graham MLB; 53 Drew Mahalic OLB; 57 Floyd Rice OLB; 59 Frank Tate MLB; Defensive backs (DB): 46 Danny Colbert CB; 42 Chris Fletcher FS; 42 Mike Fuller SS; 45 Hal Stringert CB; 25 Maurice Tyler FS; 20 Mike Williams CB; 47 Sam Williams CB; Special teams (ST): 29 Dennis Partee P; 15 Ray Wersching K	Reserve: -- Charles Anthony LB (IR); -- Jim Harrison RB (IR); -- Bud Magrum DT/DE (IR); -- Kevin Nosbusch DT (IR); 76 Terry Owens T (IR); 77 John Teerlinck DT (IR); -- Charles Waddell TE (IR); 33 Don Woods RB (IR); Rookies in italics

== Preseason ==
San Diego's offense struggled through much of the preseason, beginning with a shutout loss to the Bears. Dan Fouts led his offense 67 yards on their opening drive, reaching the Chicago 1-yard line before a botched handoff between the quarterback and Bo Matthews resulted in a fumble Chicago recovered. Fouts stayed in the game for three quarters, but the Chargers had few threats after that. They ran their scoreless streak up to seven complete quarters in the next game, falling behind the Giants 17–0 before Don Woods managed a late touchdown. The offense improved in San Diego's third and final home game of the preseason, a 20–7 win over the 49ers. Fouts and rookie quarterback Neal Jeffrey combined for 253 passing yards, throwing one touchdown pass each to newly signed tight end Curran and veteran wide receiver Gary Garrison.

Charger quarterbacks were sacked seven times in St. Louis, and they were again kept out of the end zone. Ray Wersching kicked three field goals, good for a 9–7 lead late in the game, but a Cardinal touchdown with 29 seconds remaining provided the winning points. First-round draftee Gary scored on a fumble return against the Patriots; with Fouts having run for a touchdown earlier, the Chargers led 17–7, but New England responded with 24 unanswered points before a late touchdown pass from Virgil Carter to Garrison ended the scoring. Fouts struggled, completing 4 of 9 for 55 yards, with two interceptions. Finally, San Diego played a scoreless first half against the Vikings, eventually breaking through in the 3rd quarter with a 28-yard touchdown from Jesse Freitas to Dwight McDonald. Minnesota levelled the scores, then Freitas threw an interception that was run back for a 14–7 Vikings advantage. The Chargers bounced back with a 71-yard touchdown drive, Young scoring with four seconds remaining to send the game into overtime, where there was no further scoring.

Carter, a World Football League player in 1974, had only joined the Chargers in August but was named the starter for their regular season opener.

1975 preseason games
Week	Date	Opponent	Result	Record	Venue	Attendance
1	August 9	Chicago Bears	L 0–22	0–1	San Diego Stadium	30,497
2	August 16	New York Giants	L 7–17	0–2	San Diego Stadium	28,305
3	August 21	San Francisco 49ers	W 20–7	1–2	San Diego Stadium	18,764
4	August 30	at St. Louis Cardinals	L 9–14	1–3	Busch Memorial Stadium	37,468
5	September 7	at New England Patriots	L 24–31	1–4	Schaefer Stadium	39,502
6	September 13	at Minnesota Vikings	T 14–14 (OT)	1–4–1	Metropolitan Stadium	31,642

== Regular season ==
=== Overview ===
With an 0–11 start, the prospect of the NFL's first 0–14 record and first winless and tieless season since World War II led to serious discussion of the Chargers' plight in the press. San Diego eventually finished 2–12, tying the New Orleans Saints for the NFL's worst record. 1975 would remain as the Chargers' poorest record until they went 1–15 in 2000.

San Diego's offense struggled in 1975, getting shut out three times in their first six games and finishing the season ranked 25th for both points scored and yards gained in the 26-team NFL. An inability to sustain drives led them to run only 821 plays during the season, the fewest in the league (their opponents ran 1,022 plays against them). Neither Fouts (nine starts) nor Freitas (four starts) were able to spark the passing game – the Chargers had 1,610 passing yards and seven passing touchdowns, both second-worst in the league. Fouts threw only two touchdowns against ten interceptions but was still the top Charger by passer rating with 59.3 (the league average was 65.8). The offensive line struggled with pass protection, as Charger quarterbacks were sacked on a league-high 12.9% of pass attempts.

Offseason acquisition Curran was the leading receiver, his 45 receptions and 619 yards both ranking third in the league among tight ends. Ten-year veteran Garrison started every game at wide receiver, but managed barely 30 yards per game, his career low at that point; another wide receiver, McDonald, caught only 19 passes all year but led the team with 3 receiving touchdowns. The running game was little-used (the third fewest carries in the league) and hampered by an injury to Woods, the previous season's Offensive Rookie of the Year. Woods played in only five games before a knee injury ended his season, gaining 317 yards; rookie Young was his primary replacement, finishing with a team-high 577 yards. Young scored five touchdowns rushing and one receiving, giving him twice as many as the next-best Charger.

The defensive unit performed somewhat better, ranking 20th by points allowed and 23rd by yardage (18th by yards per play). Rookies featured heavily, with Dean, Kelcher and Johnson all starting games on the line, while Mike Williams and Mike Fuller did the same in the backfield. Veteran Coy Bacon was credited with a team-high 10 sacks, while Dean had 6 1/2. Chris Fletcher led the team with six interceptions.

Kicker Wersching made only half of his kicks (12 of 24), and Dennis Partee averaged 36.8 yards per punt – both ranked among the worst in the league statistically. Fuller handled punt and kick returns, ranking sixth in the league in the former category with 11.6 yards per return, with one touchdown. San Diego's coverage team struggled with opposing kickoff returns, giving up a league-high 27.5 yards per return.

=== Schedule ===
1975 regular season games
Week	Date	Opponent	Result	Record	Venue	Attendance	Recap
1	September 21	Pittsburgh Steelers	**L** 0–37	0–1	San Diego Stadium	35,853	Recap
2	September 28	at Houston Oilers	**L** 17–33	0–2	Houston Astrodome	33,765	Recap
3	October 5	**Oakland Raiders**	**L** 0–6	0–3	San Diego Stadium	31,095	Recap
4	October 12	Los Angeles Rams	**L** 10–13 (OT)	0–4	San Diego Stadium	37,382	Recap
5	October 19	**Kansas City Chiefs**	**L** 10–12	0–5	San Diego Stadium	26,469	Recap
6	October 26	at **Oakland Raiders**	**L** 0–25	0–6	Oakland–Alameda County Coliseum	42,796	Recap
7	November 1	at New York Giants	**L** 24–35	0–7	Shea Stadium	52,032	Recap
8	November 9	New England Patriots	**L** 19–33	0–8	San Diego Stadium	24,349	Recap
9	November 16	**Denver Broncos**	**L** 17–27	0–9	San Diego Stadium	26,048	Recap
10	November 23	at Minnesota Vikings	**L** 13–28	0–10	Metropolitan Stadium	43,737	Recap
11	November 30	at **Denver Broncos**	**L** 10–13 (OT)	0–11	Mile High Stadium	44,982	Recap
12	December 7	at **Kansas City Chiefs**	**W** 28–20	1–11	Arrowhead Stadium	46,888	Recap
13	December 15	New York Jets	**W** 24–16	2–11	San Diego Stadium	49,706	Recap
14	December 21	at Cincinnati Bengals	**L** 17–47	2–12	Riverfront Stadium	46,474	Recap
Note: Intra-division opponents are in **bold** text.

=== Game summaries ===
==== Week 1: vs. Pittsburgh Steelers ====
Week One: Pittsburgh Steelers at San Diego Chargers – Game summary

Quarter	1	2	3	4	Total
**Steelers**	10	10	3	14	**37**
Chargers	0	0	0	0	**0**

at San Diego Stadium, San Diego, California

- Date: September 21
- Game time: 1:00 p.m. PDT
- Game weather: 69 °F (20.6 °C), relative humidity 77%, wind 11 mph
- Game attendance: 35,853
- Referee: Gordon McCarter
- TV announcers (NBC): Ross Porter and Willie Davis
- Box score

Game information

**First quarter**

- PIT – Roy Gerela 29-yard field goal, 7:35. Steelers 3–0. **Drive: 12 plays, 56 yards, 5:14.**
- PIT – Frank Lewis 40-yard pass from Terry Bradshaw (Roy Gerela kick), 4:29. Steelers 10–0. **Drive: 2 plays, 59 yards, 0:48.**

**Second quarter**

- PIT – Gerry Mullins offensive fumble recovery in end zone (Roy Gerela kick), 13:39. Steelers 17–0. **Drive: 5 plays, 26 yards, 2:09.**
- PIT – Roy Gerela 25-yard field goal, 1:47. Steelers 20–0. **Drive: 15 plays, 73 yards, 7:25.**

**Third quarter**

- PIT – Roy Gerela 38-yard field goal, 3:57. Steelers 23–0. **Drive: 4 plays, 5 yards, 0:48.**

**Fourth quarter**

- PIT – John Stallworth 38-yard pass from Terry Bradshaw (Roy Gerela kick), 11:08. Steelers 30–0. **Drive: 6 plays, 68 yards, 2:07.**
- PIT – Mike Collier 7-yard run (Roy Gerela kick), 1:56. Steelers 37–0. **Drive: 14 plays, 83 yards, 6:19.**

**Top passers**

- PIT – Terry Bradshaw – 21/28, 227 yards, 2 TD
- SDG – Dan Fouts – 6/13, 36 yards, INT

**Top rushers**

- PIT – Franco Harris – 17 rushes, 78 yards
- SDG – Don Woods – 13 rushes, 35 yards

**Top receivers**

- PIT – Frank Lewis – 4 receptions, 69 yards, TD
- SDG – Pat Curran – 6 receptions, 42 yards

San Diego's season began badly, with a shutout defeat at home against the defending Super Bowl champions. Virgil Carter started the game but could generate only three first downs in the Chargers' first four possessions, getting intercepted once. Pittsburgh, in the meantime, scored on each of their answering possessions to take a 20–0 lead late in the half. Carter was then pulled from the game and did not play for the Chargers again. His replacement Fouts led a 39-yard drive that reached the Pittsburgh 41, from where he was intercepted as the half ended.

That proved to be the Chargers' longest drive of the day, as well as their deepest penetration into Steeler territory. Pittsburgh added seventeen further points in the second half, while Freitas replaced Fouts and became the third San Diego quarterback to be intercepted on the day. The Steelers finished with a 443–146 advantage in total yardage.

==== Week 2: at Houston Oilers ====
Week Two: San Diego Chargers at Houston Oilers – Game summary

Quarter	1	2	3	4	Total
Chargers	7	3	0	7	**17**
**Oilers**	3	13	7	10	**33**

at Houston, Houston, Texas

- Date: September 28
- Game time: 1:00 p.m. CDT
- Game weather: N/A (game played indoors)
- Game attendance: 33,765
- Referee: Jim Tunney
- TV announcers (NBC): Ross Porter and Willie Davis
- Box score

Game information

**First quarter**

- HOU – Skip Butler 29-yard field goal, 6:24. Oilers 3–0. **Drive: 14 plays, 56 yards, 7:12.**
- SDG – Don Woods 4-yard run (Ray Wersching kick), 1:23. Chargers 7–3. **Drive: 10 plays, 67 yards, 5:01.**

**Second quarter**

- HOU – Don Hardeman 1-yard run (kick failed), 9:22. Oilers 9–7. **Drive: 10 plays, 56 yards, 2:47.**
- HOU – John Sawyer 4-yard pass from Dan Pastorini (Skip Butler kick), 0:44. Oilers 16–7. **Drive: 11 plays, 83 yards, 2:27.**
- SDG – Ray Wersching 29-yard field goal, 0:03. Oilers 16–10. **Drive: 5 plays, 33 yards, 0:33.**

**Third quarter**

- HOU – Ronnie Coleman 46-yard run (Skip Butler kick), 11:11. Oilers 23–10. **Drive: 8 plays, 83 yards, 3:49.**

**Fourth quarter**

- HOU – Curley Culp 38-yard defensive fumble return (Skip Butler kick), 14:50. Oilers 30–10.
- SDG – Dwight McDonald 30-yard pass from Jesse Freitas (Ray Wersching kick), 9:58. Oilers 30–17. **Drive: 1 play, 35 yards, 0:06.**
- HOU – Skip Butler 38-yard field goal, 0:10. Oilers 33–17. **Drive: 4 plays, 6 yards, 1:41.**

**Top passers**

- SDG – Dan Fouts – 10/18, 129 yards
- HOU – Dan Pastorini – 12/23, 144 yards, TD

**Top rushers**

- SDG – Don Woods – 16 rushes, 60 yards, TD
- HOU – Ronnie Coleman – 16 rushes, 112 yards, TD

**Top receivers**

- SDG – Dwight McDonald – 4 receptions, 57 yards, TD
- HOU – Billy Johnson – 4 receptions, 57 yards

San Diego were more competitive in their second game but still lost by a comfortable margin. After falling behind to an early field goal, Fouts led a 10-play, 67-yard drive that Woods capped with a 4-yard touchdown run. The Oilers responded with a pair of 2nd-quarter touchdowns before Wersching, who had earlier been short from 53 yards out, made a 29-yard field goal to reduce the deficit to 16–10 at halftime. Houston drove 83 yards for a touchdown to start the second half and missed field goals on their next two possessions. With Fouts unable to create scoring threats in response, he was replaced by Freitas late in the 3rd quarter. The first time Freitas dropped back to pass, he was sacked and fumbled, with Curley Culp returning the loose ball 38 yards for a touchdown. Freitas did manage a 30-yard touchdown pass to McDonald in response, but his tipped pass was intercepted in Oiler territory on the next Chargers possession, and a late Houston field goal was the only scoring after that.

Freitas was sacked on five of the thirteen occasions that he dropped back to pass; Fouts was also sacked once.

==== Week 3: vs. Oakland Raiders ====
Week Three: Oakland Raiders at San Diego Chargers – Game summary

Quarter	1	2	3	4	Total
**Raiders**	0	3	0	3	**6**
Chargers	0	0	0	0	**0**

at San Diego Stadium, San Diego, California

- Date: October 5
- Game time: 1:00 p.m. PDT
- Game weather: 66 °F (18.9 °C), relative humidity 84%, wind 8 mph
- Game attendance: 31,095
- Referee: Bernie Ulman
- TV announcers (KBHK, San Francisco): Don Klein and Al LoCasale
- Box score

Game information

**First quarter**

- No scoring plays.

**Second quarter**

- OAK – George Blanda 35-yard field goal, 11:07. Raiders 3–0. **Drive: 8 plays, 40 yards, 3:30.**

**Third quarter**

- No scoring plays.

**Fourth quarter**

- OAK – George Blanda 29-yard field goal, 6:31. Raiders 6–0. **Drive: 12 plays, 39 yards, 7:25.**

**Top passers**

- OAK – Larry Lawrence – 5/15, 50 yards, INT
- SDG – Dan Fouts – 3/13, 29 yards, 2 INT

**Top rushers**

- OAK – Pete Banaszak – 16 rushes, 76 yards
- SDG – Don Woods – 15 rushes, 45 yards

**Top receivers**

- OAK – Cliff Branch – 3 receptions, 44 yards
- SDG – Don Woods – 2 receptions, 15 yards

A number of negative club records were set as San Diego were shut out for the second time in their opening three games. After both sides punted on their first two possessions, the Chargers had their best drive of the game; starting from their own 1-yard line, they gained three first downs and reached the Raiders 37 when Fouts scrambled for 32 yards on 3rd and 6. A 14-yard sack pushed them back, and they were forced to punt again. Overall, the Chargers went three-and-out on six of their first seven possessions, a sequence broken when Fouts was intercepted shortly before halftime. Oakland's offense struggled as well but did manage two field goal attempts by George Blanda in the 2nd quarter, one of which was successful.

Blanda missed his next try on the opening possession of the second half. Fouts was soon intercepted again; there followed an exchange of punts, the latter of which was fumbled by Oakland's returner and recovered by Young at the Raider 48. Fouts ran for 5 yards on first down but was sacked on the next two plays, and San Diego punted once again. After Blanda's second successful field goal midway through the final quarter made it 6–0, the Chargers gained a single first down before punting, and Oakland ran out the final four minutes of the game.

The six total points remained the lowest for a Charger game until they won by the same scoreline in 2023. Fouts completed 3 of 13 for 29 yards, while throwing two interceptions and being sacked five times for a loss of 51 yards. Club records set included fewest passing yards (minus 22, still a record), fewest first downs (5), fewest completions (3), and most punts (11).

==== Week 4: vs. Los Angeles Rams ====
Week Four: Los Angeles Rams at San Diego Chargers – Game summary

Quarter	1	2	3	4	OT	Total
**Rams**	0	3	7	0	3	**13**
Chargers	0	0	10	0	0	**10**

at San Diego Stadium, San Diego, California

- Date: October 12
- Game time: 1:00 p.m. PDT
- Game weather: 66 °F (18.9 °C), relative humidity 66%, wind 12 mph
- Game attendance: 37,382
- Referee: Fred Wyant
- TV announcers (CBS): Frank Glieber and Alex Hawkins
- Box score

Game information

**First quarter**

- No scoring plays.

**Second quarter**

- RAM – Tom Dempsey 19-yard field goal, 9:21. Rams 3–0. **Drive: 13 plays, 94 yards, 6:40.**

**Third quarter**

- SDG – Don Woods 7-yard run (Ray Wersching kick), 13:06. Chargers 7–3. **Drive: 2 plays, 22 yards, 1:45.**
- SDG – Ray Wersching 36-yard field goal, 8:20. Chargers 10–3. **Drive: 8 plays, 32 yards, 3:22.**
- RAM – James Harris 2-yard run (Tom Dempsey kick), 4:30. Tied 10–10. **Drive: 8 plays, 70 yards, 3:42.**

**Fourth quarter**

- No scoring plays.

**Overtime**

- RAM – Tom Dempsey 22-yard field goal, 5:33. Rams 13–10. **Drive: 11 plays, 80 yards, 5:39.**

**Top passers**

- RAM – James Harris – 15/26, 226 yards, INT
- SDG – Dan Fouts – 17/26, 180 yards

**Top rushers**

- RAM – Lawrence McCutcheon – 20 rushes, 112 yards
- SDG – Don Woods – 24 rushes, 105 yards, TD

**Top receivers**

- RAM – Harold Jackson – 3 receptions, 60 yards
- SDG – Don Woods – 6 receptions, 57 yards

A strong performance by Woods was wasted as the Chargers lost their first ever regular season overtime game. Don Goode's interception and 37-yard return gave San Diego an early chance to score; they reached a first and goal from the 3, but a holding penalty pushed them back, and eventually Wersching hit a goalpost with a field goal try from 38 yards out. In the 2nd quarter, Goode's third-down tackle at his own 2-yard line forced the Rams to settle for a chip shot Tom Dempsey field goal. Wersching was later short from 42 yards, and Dempsey hit a goalpost from 57 yards out as Los Angeles ended the half 3–0 ahead.

Early in the 3rd quarter, Fuller recovered a fumbled punt at the Rams 22, and the offense needed only two plays to capitalize: Garrison's 15-yard catch was followed by Woods fighting through an attempted tackle for a 7-yard touchdown run. After forcing a three-and-out, the Chargers took over at their own 49, and picked up two first downs before Wersching converted a 36-yard field goal attempt. The Rams came back with a game-tying 70-yard touchdown drive. They had a chance to take the lead on their next possession, but Dempsey was wide left from 41 yards out. Following an exchange of punts, San Diego missed an opportunity of their own. Woods had a 22-yard catch and a 13-yard rush on consecutive play, and Garrison's 13-yard catch on 3rd and 10 brought up a 1st and 10 from the Los Angeles 17. Tony Baker fumbled while trying to take Fouts's handoff on the next play, and the Rams recovered with nine minutes left in regulation.

The game went into overtime without further incident. San Diego won the coin toss and elected to receive the kickoff – they picked up two first downs to reach the Los Angeles 42-yard line, but Fouts was sacked and they were forced to punt. The Rams then drove from their own 14 to the Chargers 6, converting a pair of third downs along the way. From there, Dempsey's 22-yard field goal won the game.

Despite the narrow margin of this game, the Rams went on to finish the regular season with ten more wins than San Diego. Woods carried 24 times for 105 yards and a touchdown, while catching 6 passes for 57 yards; he accounted for 162 of his side's 272 total yards.

==== Week 5: vs. Kansas City Chiefs ====
Week Five: Kansas City Chiefs at San Diego Chargers – Game summary

Quarter	1	2	3	4	Total
**Chiefs**	0	9	0	3	**12**
Chargers	3	0	7	0	**10**

at San Diego Stadium, San Diego, California

- Date: October 19
- Game time: 1:00 p.m. PDT
- Game weather: 65 °F (18.3 °C), relative humidity 65%, wind 8 mph
- Game attendance: 26,469
- Referee: Gene Barth
- TV announcers (NBC): Ross Porter and Willie Davis
- Box score

Game information

**First quarter**

- SDG – Ray Wersching 36-yard field goal, 11:47. Chargers 3–0. **Drive: 4 plays, −4 yards, 0:50.**

**Second quarter**

- KAN – Jan Stenerud 31-yard field goal, 9:21. Tied 3–3. **Drive: 11 plays, 55 yards, 4:41.**
- KAN – Walter White 60-yard pass from Mike Livingston (kick failed), 0:53. Chiefs 9–3. **Drive: 5 plays, 88 yards, 1:54.**

**Third quarter**

- SDG – Sam Scarber 2-yard pass from Jesse Freitas (Ray Wersching kick), 3:05. Chargers 10–9. **Drive: 9 plays, 50 yards, 5:10.**

**Fourth quarter**

- KAN – Jan Stenerud 27-yard field goal, 12:06. Chiefs 12–10. **Drive: 12 plays, 63 yards, 5:40.**

**Top passers**

- KAN – Mike Livingston – 14/23, 224 yards, TD
- SDG – Dan Fouts – 5/9, 49 yards

**Top rushers**

- KAN – Woody Green – 18 rushes, 79 yards
- SDG – Don Woods – 19 rushes, 72 yards

**Top receivers**

- KAN – Walter White – 2 receptions, 105 yards, TD
- SDG – Pat Curran – 3 receptions, 42 yards

Missed opportunities in the final quarter led to another low-scoring defeat for the Chargers. The Chiefs went three-and-out to start the game, and Fuller's 29-yard punt return set the Chargers up at Kansas City's 15-yard line. The ensuing drive went four yards backwards, but Wersching was successful from 36 yards out. He missed from 49 yards later in the quarter, but his opposite number Jan Stenerud had a kick blocked by Danny Colbert soon afterwards, with Fuller returning the ball 23 yards to the Chiefs' 49. San Diego moved to the 30, helped by a Kansas City offsides penalty when the Chargers were punting on 4th and 1. However, Sam Scarber lost a fumble, and the Chiefs drove into range for Stenerud to tie the score. Kansas City tight end Walter White was wide open on a 60-yard touchdown catch 53 seconds before halftime; the extra point was blocked by Maurice Tyler, and Kansas City led 9–3 at the interval.

With Fouts only able to muster 23 net passing yards in the first half, Freitas came in to replace him. On his first possession, San Diego drove to a first down inside the Chiefs 30, primarily using the run. Curran was then flagged for illegal use of hands, and Freitas threw two incompletions followed by an interception. On the next drive, a Stenerud kick was blocked for the second time by Colbert, with Fuller again recovering. Starting from midfield, the Chargers capitalized in full; Freitas completed a 14-yard pass to Young on 3rd and 12, then a 2-yard touchdown pass to Scarber. Wersching's extra point put San Diego up 10–9. Kansas City responded with a 63-yard drive, capped by Stenerud's go-ahead field goal early in the final quarter. The Chargers had an opportunity to respond shortly afterwards: Dean recovered a fumble at the Kansas City 25, the offense gained six yards from three plays, and Wersching was wide right from 36 yards out. Next, Fuller's 44-yard punt return set San Diego up at the Chiefs 36-yard line. Terry Owens was flagged for holding on first down before Joe Sweet's 16-yard catch on 3rd and 17 left the Chargers with a 4th and 1 at the Kansas City 27. Prothro opted to go for the first down rather than trying another field goal, and Young was stopped for no gain with 4:39 to play. The lone Charger possession after that was a three-and-out.

San Diego's quarterbacks combined for 93 yards passing, while being sacked five times for the loss of 32. Woods rushed 19 times for 72 yards and caught 2 passes for 14 more but also picked up an knee ligament injury and missed the rest of the season. It was to prove a career-changing injury for Woods, who had rushed for 100 yards or more on eight occasions in a 17-game career prior to it but never did so again.

==== Week 6: at Oakland Raiders ====
Week Six: San Diego Chargers at Oakland Raiders – Game summary

Quarter	1	2	3	4	Total
Chargers	0	0	0	0	**0**
**Raiders**	2	7	14	2	**25**

at Oakland-Alameda County Coliseum, Oakland, California

- Date: October 26
- Game time: 1:00 p.m. PST
- Game weather: 59 °F (15.0 °C), relative humidity 87%, wind 10 mph
- Game attendance: 42,796
- Referee: Ben Dreith
- TV announcers (NBC): Ross Porter and Willie Davis
- Box score

Game information

**First quarter**

- OAK – Safety, Mike Dennery tackled Dennis Partee in end zone, 14:10. Raiders 2–0.

**Second quarter**

- OAK – Pete Banaszak 1-yard run (George Blanda kick), 3:23. Raiders 9–0. **Drive: 7 plays, 60 yards, 3:30.**

**Third quarter**

- OAK – Cliff Branch 45-yard pass from Ken Stabler (George Blanda kick), 13:27. Raiders 16–0. **Drive: 3 plays, 48 yards, 1:33.**
- OAK – Pete Banaszak 2-yard run (George Blanda kick), 5:02. Raiders 23–0. **Drive: 9 plays, 44 yards, 4:57.**

**Fourth quarter**

- OAK – Safety, Ted Hendricks tackled Jesse Freitas in end zone, 3:09. Raiders 25–0.

**Top passers**

- SDG – Bobby Douglass – 6/22, 49 yards
- OAK – Ken Stabler – 13/20, 171 yards, TD, INT

**Top rushers**

- SDG – Glen Bonner – 11 rushes, 47 yards
- OAK – Mark van Eeghen – 10 rushes, 47 yards

**Top receivers**

- SDG – Pat Curran – 4 receptions, 49 yards
- OAK – Cliff Branch – 5 receptions, 95 yards, TD

San Diego trailed for over 59 minutes as they were shut out for the third time in six weeks and for the second time by the Raiders. Freitas started at quarterback – he threw two incompletions to open the game, before being sacked for a 7-yard loss. Punter Partee then struggled to field a low snap and was brought down in the end zone for a safety fifty seconds into the game. San Diego went three-and-out on their next possession, before Tom Graham stopped a Raider threat with a goal line interception. Freitas was then pulled from the game. With Fouts out with an ankle sprain, Bobby Douglass was the replacement—the fourth quarterback the Chargers had used in 1975. His first possession under center ended in another three-and-out, and Oakland drove 60 yards for a touchdown and a 9–0 lead.

The Chargers had their longest drive in response, primarily using the run as they drove from their own 28-yard line to the Raiders 17. From there, Wersching missed a 34-yard field goal, and San Diego's best chance to score was gone. They crossed midfield four more times throughout the game, but each time the drive stalled and they were forced to punt. Oakland, meanwhile, scored touchdowns on their first two possessions of the second half to break the game open. Douglass was intercepted late on, and Freitas returned as quarterback. He was sacked for another safety on his first play, completing the scoring.

Freitas and Douglass combined for only 8 completions from 28 attempts for 58 yards, while being sacked twice each for a combined loss of 41 yards. This gave them 17 net yards passing; set again their minus 22 yards from the first Raider game, they finished with negative passing yards from the two games.

==== Week 7: at New York Giants ====
Week Seven: San Diego Chargers at New York Giants – Game summary

Quarter	1	2	3	4	Total
Chargers	7	7	7	3	**24**
**Giants**	14	7	7	7	**35**

at Shea Stadium, New York, New York

- Date: November 1
- Game time: 1:00 p.m. EST
- Game weather: 48 °F (8.9 °C), relative humidity 41%, wind 14 mph
- Game attendance: 52,032
- Referee: Cal Lepore
- TV: None
- Box score

Game information

**First quarter**

- NYG – Joe Dawkins 1-yard run (George Hunt kick), 5:20. Giants 7–0. **Drive: 10 plays, 67 yards, 3:59.**
- SDG – Rickey Young 48-yard run (Ray Wersching kick), 3:13. Tied 7–7. **Drive: 7 plays, 77 yards, 2:07.**
- NYG – Joe Dawkins 14-yard run (George Hunt kick), 2:21. Giants 14–7. **Drive: 2 plays, 23 yards, 0:52.**

**Second quarter**

- SDG – Dan Fouts 1-yard run (Ray Wersching kick), 9:48. Tied 14–14. **Drive: 16 plays, 90 yards, 7:33.**
- NYG – Ray Rhodes 24-yard pass from Craig Morton (George Hunt kick), 3:10. Giants 21–14. **Drive: 10 plays, 64 yards, 6:38.**

**Third quarter**

- SDG – Dwight McDonald 30-yard pass from Dan Fouts (Ray Wersching kick), 12:41. Tied 21–21. **Drive: 5 plays, 70 yards, 2:19.**
- NYG – Bob Tucker 47-yard pass from Craig Morton (George Hunt kick), 4:15. Giants 28–21. **Drive: 3 plays, 63 yards, 1:25.**

**Fourth quarter**

- SDG – Ray Wersching 26-yard field goal, 13:31. Giants 28–24. **Drive: 10 plays, 71 yards, 5:44.**
- NYG – Ron Johnson 1-yard run (George Hunt kick), 1:56. Giants 35–24. **Drive: 11 plays, 64 yards, 5:33.**

**Top passers**

- SDG – Dan Fouts – 13/25, 179 yards, TD, INT
- NYG – Craig Morton – 18/26, 191 yards, 2 TD, INT

**Top rushers**

- SDG – Rickey Young – 15 rushes, 93 yards, TD
- NYG – Larry Watkins – 13 rushes, 71 yards

**Top receivers**

- SDG – Pat Curran – 4 receptions, 78 yards
- NYG – Bob Tucker – 5 receptions, 69 yards, TD

A greatly improved offensive performance was not enough to prevent the Chargers from arriving at the midway point of the season winless. The Giants struck first, converting a 4th and 1 en route to Joe Dawkins's 4-yard run. San Diego responded with a 7-play, 77-yard drive; Young gained 14 yards on a draw to reach Giants territory and broke away through the right tackle area for a 48-yard touchdown two plays later. New York came straight back to lead again, Dawkins scoring from the 13-yard line two plays after a 64-yard kickoff return.

The Chargers' next drive took considerably longer, covering 90 yards in 16 plays. Fouts, restored to the starting line-up, converted two third downs with passes and another with a 17-yard scramble up the middle, eventually scoring himself with a 1-yard sneak. New York made it five touchdowns in five possessions with a Craig Morton touchdown pass with three minutes remaining in the half. Fouts was intercepted on the next play, Colbert intercepted Morton in return, and the score was 21–14 at the break.

Five plays into the second half, the score was tied again. Fouts found Curran for a 24-yard gain, then followed that with a 30-yard touchdown pass to McDonald in the back of the end zone. Rookie Mike Williams later stopped a Giants threat with a fumble recovery, but Morton's second touchdown pass followed soon afterwards. Fouts completed passes to four different receivers in response, but the drive stalled inside the New York 10, and Wersching hit a 27-yard field goal. The Giants punted on their next possession, giving San Diego a chance to take the lead in the final ten minutes. They picked up one first down but were soon forced to punt themselves. New York then drove 64 yards in 11 plays, putting the game away with a touchdown 1:56 from time.

Young rushed 15 times for 93 yards and a touchdown, while adding 1 catch for 11 yards. San Diego gained 167 passing yards and 182 rushing yards, both season highs to that point.

==== Week 8: vs. New England Patriots ====
Week Eight: New England Patriots at San Diego Chargers – Game summary

Quarter	1	2	3	4	Total
**Patriots**	10	13	7	3	**33**
Chargers	3	3	10	3	**19**

at San Diego Stadium, San Diego, California

- Date: November 8
- Game time: 1:00 p.m. PST
- Game weather: 62 °F (16.7 °C), relative humidity 73%, wind 8 mph
- Game attendance: 24,349
- Referee: Gordon McCarter
- TV announcers (NBC): Jay Randolph and Paul Maguire
- Box score

Game information

**First quarter**

- SDG – Ray Wersching 41-yard field goal, 11:42. Chargers 3–0. **Drive: 7 plays, 23 yards, 1:56.**
- NE – John Smith 38-yard field goal, 5:15. Tied 3–3. **Drive: 15 plays, 60 yards, 6:27.**
- NE – Bob Howard 44-yard interception return (John Smith kick), 1:57. Patriots 10–3.

**Second quarter**

- SDG – Ray Wersching 30-yard field goal, 10:49. Patriots 10–6. **Drive: 14 plays, 61 yards, 6:02.**
- NE – John Smith 19-yard field goal, 6:38. Patriots 13–6. **Drive: 9 plays, 51 yards, 4:11.**
- NE – Sam Cunningham 4-yard run (John Smith kick), 3:39. Patriots 20–6. **Drive: 3 plays, 79 yards, 0:26.**
- NE – John Smith 35-yard field goal, 0:34. Patriots 23–6. **Drive: 7 plays, 44 yards, 1:18.**

**Third quarter**

- SDG – Ray Wersching 25-yard field goal, 11:46. Patriots 23–9. **Drive: 4 plays, 2 yards, 0:46.**
- NE – Randy Vataha 13-yard pass from Steve Grogan (John Smith kick), 7:03. Patriots 30–9. **Drive: 12 plays, 64 yards, 4:30.**
- SDG – Gary Garrison 8-yard pass from Dan Fouts (Ray Wersching kick), 3:26. Patriots 30–16. **Drive: 7 plays, 75 yards, 3:37.**

**Fourth quarter**

- NE – John Smith 46-yard field goal, 14:47. Patriots 33–16. **Drive: 8 plays, 42 yards, 3:39.**
- SDG – Ray Wersching 37-yard field goal, 9:33. Patriots 33–19. **Drive: 11 plays, 52 yards, 5:14.**

**Top passers**

- NE – Steve Grogan – 17/28, 245 yards, TD, INT
- SDG – Dan Fouts – 25/42, 329 yards, TD, 2 INT

**Top rushers**

- NE – Sam Cunningham – 21 rushes, 90 yards, TD
- SDG – Rickey Young – 15 rushes, 44 yards

**Top receivers**

- NE – Russ Francis – 3 receptions, 81 yards
- SDG – Gary Garrison – 7 receptions, 108 yards, TD

San Diego's offensive improvement continued, but they again lost by over ten points. In the opening quarter, Wersching put his team ahead with a 41-yard field goal, the Patriots tied the score, and Wersching missed from 49 yards out. Sam Williams intercepted New England quarterback Steve Grogan soon afterwards, but only three plays later, former Charger Bob Howard intercepted Fouts in turn, returning the ball 44 yards for a touchdown. Fouts rebounded on the next drive, converting three third downs with passes, but San Diego settled for a Wersching field goal. Three sustained drives by New England then resulted in 13 unanswered points and a 23–6 lead at halftime.

Johnson recovered a fumble at the New England 10-yard line early in the second half, but the Chargers could only capitalize with a field goal. Tyler prolonged the next Patriots drive with a holding penalty on a punt, and Grogan eventually stretched the lead to 21 points with a touchdown pass. San Diego were able to respond, with Sweet's 52-yard catch taking them to the New England 11 before Garrison's touchdown catch on 4th and 7 from the 8. The Patriots added a field goal early in the final quarter. Fouts found Garrison with a 35-yard completion on the next play and converted a 4th and 12 with a 26-yard pass to McDonald; San Diego got as far as the 2-yard line, but eventually had to settle for a field goal after Fouts was sacked on 3rd and goal. New England recovered an onside kick, but Dean recovered a fumbled snap three plays later. Trailing by 14, Fouts completed four consecutive passes, moving the ball from his own 40-yard line to the Patriots 8. Following a 3-yard run by Young and two incompletions, Fouts was sacked to end the threat with six minutes to play. Fouts was also intercepted on the lone Charger possession after that.

Fouts had the second 300-yard game of his career, completing 25 of 42 for 329 yards, 1 touchdown and 2 interceptions. He was also sacked seven times for 50 yards. Garrison had the 23rd and final 100-yard game of his career, catching 7 passes for 108 yards and a touchdown. The Chargers were hampered by a club record-tying 14 penalties, for 120 yards.

==== Week 9: vs. Denver Broncos ====
Week Nine: Denver Broncos at San Diego Chargers – Game summary

Quarter	1	2	3	4	Total
**Broncos**	7	10	0	10	**27**
Chargers	3	7	7	0	**17**

at San Diego Stadium, San Diego, California

- Date: November 15
- Game time: 1:00 p.m. PST
- Game weather: 57 °F (13.9 °C), relative humidity 84%, wind 8 mph
- Game attendance: 26,048
- Referee: Chuck Heberling
- TV announcers (NBC): Jim Simpson and John Brodie
- Box score

Game information

**First quarter**

- DEN – Haven Moses 7-yard pass from Steve Ramsey (Jim Turner kick), 7:56. Broncos 7–0. **Drive: 13 plays, 72 yards, 7:04.**
- SDG – Ray Wersching 22-yard field goal, 1:26. Broncos 7–3. **Drive: 13 plays, 68 yards, 6:30.**

**Second quarter**

- DEN – Jim Turner 22-yard field goal, 12:58. Broncos 10–3. **Drive: 8 plays, 57 yards, 3:28.**
- DEN – Riley Odoms 3-yard pass from Steve Ramsey (Jim Turner kick), 2:33. Broncos 17–3. **Drive: 11 plays, 55 yards, 6:22.**
- SDG – Bo Matthews 2-yard run (Ray Wersching kick), 0:47. Broncos 17–10. **Drive: 6 plays, 72 yards, 1:46.**

**Third quarter**

- SDG – Rickey Young 9-yard run (Ray Wersching kick), 13:13. Tied 17–17. **Drive: 6 plays, 70 yards, 1:47.**

**Fourth quarter**

- DEN – Jon Keyworth 1-yard run (Jim Turner kick), 10:15. Broncos 24–17. **Drive: 19 plays, 99 yards, 9:44.**
- DEN – Jim Turner 46-yard field goal, 4:01. Broncos 27–17. **Drive: 7 plays, 18 yards, 3:16.**

**Top passers**

- DEN – Steve Ramsey – 24/36, 225 yards, 2 TD, 2 INT
- SDG – Dan Fouts – 13/20, 211 yards, INT

**Top rushers**

- DEN – Floyd Little – 18 rushes, 44 yards
- SDG – Rickey Young – 9 rushes, 52 yards, TD

**Top receivers**

- DEN – Jack Dolbin – 3 receptions, 53 yards
- SDG – Gary Garrison – 3 receptions, 70 yards

A Chargers comeback attempt faltered in the latter stages as their winless start continued. Most of the opening quarter was taken up by two 13-play drives, as Denver went 72 yards for a touchdown with the opening kickoff, and San Diego responded by moving 68 yards before being stopped at the 5, with Fouts protesting that his third down incompletion should have drawn a flag for defensive holding. They took a field goal and Denver later responded in kind. The Chargers reached a 4th and 1 at the Broncos 30, but Matthews' dive up the middle was ruled not to have gained a first down, and Prothro was flagged 15 yards for his protestations. Denver drove 55 yards the other way and extended their lead to 17–3 with another touchdown. In response, the Chargers drove from their own 28 to the Denver 42; Garrison then caught a pass at the 23, slipped under a tackle and reached the 2-yard line before being stopped. Matthews scored a play later. On the final play of the half, Mike Williams intercepted a pass at his own 26-yard line and managed a 40-yard return before being tackled.

Three plays into the second half, Fouts threw a deep pass on 3rd and 8 that McDonald brought in for a gain of 57; three plays after that, Young went around right end for a 9-yard touchdown on 3rd and 8, tying the score at 17–17. After forcing a punt, they reached a 3rd and goal from the 7. Fouts completed a pass to Curran, who was driven out of bounds at the 1-yard line. Prothro opted to try for a touchdown, but Matthews was stuffed for no gain with five minutes left in the 3rd quarter. Denver then embarked on an 18-play, 99-yard touchdown drive, featuring four third-down conversions and taking up nearly ten minutes of game time. After Fouts was intercepted on the next Chargers possessions, Denver added a field goal with four minutes to play, and San Diego failed to gain a first down on their final two possessions.

Fouts avoided taking a sack for the first time all season (although Douglass came in late in the game and was sacked twice).

==== Week 10: at Minnesota Vikings ====
Week Ten: San Diego Chargers at Minnesota Vikings – Game summary

Quarter	1	2	3	4	Total
Chargers	0	7	0	6	**13**
**Vikings**	7	7	0	14	**28**

at Metropolitan Stadium, Bloomington, Minnesota

- Date: November 22
- Game time: 1:00 p.m. CST
- Game weather: 23 °F (−5.0 °C), relative humidity 75%, wind 8 mph, wind chill 14
- Game attendance: 43,737
- Referee: Tommy Bell
- TV announcers (NBC): Ross Porter and Willie Davis
- Box score

Game information

**First quarter**

- MIN – Chuck Foreman 1-yard run (Fred Cox kick), 9:46. Vikings 7–0. **Drive: 10 plays, 80 yards, 5:14.**

**Second quarter**

- SDG – Gary Garrison 32-yard pass from Jesse Freitas (Pat Curran pass from Mike Fuller), 5:26. Tied 7–7. **Drive: 5 plays, 72 yards, 1:46.**
- MIN – Ed Marinaro 16-yard pass from Fran Tarkenton (Fred Cox kick), 0:31. Vikings 14–7. **Drive: 6 plays, 47 yards, 1:25.**

**Third quarter**

- No scoring plays.

**Fourth quarter**

- MIN – Chuck Foreman 1-yard run (Fred Cox kick), 9:32. Vikings 21–7. **Drive: 9 plays, 52 yards, 4:53.**
- SDG – Dwight McDonald 16-yard pass from Jesse Freitas (kick blocked), 5:19. Vikings 21–13. **Drive: 2 plays, 52 yards, 0:42.**
- MIN – Chuck Foreman 9-yard run (Fred Cox kick), 2:23. Vikings 28–13. **Drive: 6 plays, 46 yards, 2:56.**

**Top passers**

- SDG – Jesse Freitas – 15/23, 174 yards, 2 TD, INT
- MIN – Fran Tarkenton – 24/32, 201 yards, TD, 2 INT

**Top rushers**

- SDG – Rickey Young – 14 rushes, 29 yards
- MIN – Chuck Foreman – 33 rushes, 127 yards, 3 TD

**Top receivers**

- SDG – Gary Garrison – 3 receptions, 61 yards, TD
- MIN – Ed Marinaro – 11 receptions, 79 yards

For the second consecutive week, a goal line stand foiled the Chargers at a key moment. Minnesota, who entered the game unbeaten, took the opening kickoff and drove 80 yards in 10 plays for Chuck Foreman's touchdown run. San Diego, with Freitas in at quarterback, failed to gain a first down on their first three possessions, but Fletcher intercepted Fran Tarkenton to help keep the deficit at just seven points after one quarter. After the Vikings missed a field goal, San Diego moved to the Minnesota 32-yard line, from where Freitas found Garrison at the goal line for a touchdown. The extra point attempt was almost ruined by a bad snap, but holder Fuller improvised a pass to Curran, and the score was tied. The Chargers were close to midfield on their next drive when Young fumbled; Minnesota recovered and retook the lead at 14–7 on Tarkenton's touchdown pass with 31 seconds left in the half.

Mike Williams intercepted a tipped Tarkenton pass early in the second half, and Garrison appeared to have given his team a first down at the Vikings 25, only for Flanagan to be flagged for holding. The Chargers were forced to punt, but Partee's 61-yard kick was downed at the 1-yard line by Fuller. After forcing a three-and-out, San Diego took over on the Vikings 23 following Fuller's 20-yard punt return, and soon reached a 1st and goal at the 1-yard line. The Chargers tried four consecutive rushes from there, but Minnesota stopped the first three for no gain and the fourth for the loss of a yard after Young tripped over the legs of teammate Craig Cotton. Following an exchange of punts, Foreman scored his second touchdown. San Diego appeared to have closed to within a single score with five minutes to play, after a two-play drive: McDonald had catches of 22 yards and 16 yards for a touchdown, either side of a 16-yard pass interference penalty. Wersching's extra point was blocked to leave the deficit at eight points. Minnesota then recovered an onside kick, and Foreman added his third touchdown to make sure of the result.

Freitas completed 15 of 23 passes for 174 yards, with two touchdowns and an interception. This gave him a passer rating of 98.8, which would be the best of his two years in the league.

==== Week 11: at Denver Broncos ====
Week Eleven: San Diego Chargers at Denver Broncos – Game summary

Quarter	1	2	3	4	OT	Total
Chargers	0	10	0	0	0	**10**
**Broncos**	7	0	3	0	3	**13**

at Mile High Stadium, Denver, Colorado

- Date: November 29
- Game time: 2:00 p.m. MST
- Game weather: 19 °F (−7.2 °C), relative humidity 49%, wind 18 mph, wind chill 4
- Game attendance: 44,982
- Referee: Fred Wyant
- TV announcers (NBC): Jay Randolph and Willie Davis
- Box score

Game information

**First quarter**

- DEN – Fran Lynch 1-yard pass from Steve Ramsey (Jim Turner kick), 8:51. Broncos 7–0. **Drive: 11 plays, 70 yards, 6:09.**

**Second quarter**

- SDG – Mike Fuller 42-yard punt return (Ray Wersching kick), 10:13. Tied 7–7.
- SDG – Ray Wersching 34-yard field goal, 7:41. Chargers 10–7. **Drive: 4 plays, 9 yards, 1:34.**

**Third quarter**

- DEN – Jim Turner 22-yard field goal, 11:15. Tied 10–10. **Drive: 8 plays, 31 yards, 2:31.**

**Fourth quarter**

- No scoring plays.

**Overtime**

- DEN – Jim Turner 25-yard field goal, 10:47. Broncos 13–10. **Drive: 7 plays, 56 yards, 4:13.**

**Top passers**

- SDG – Jesse Freitas – 8/24, 72 yards, INT
- DEN – John Hufnagel – 3/8, 26 yards, 3 INT

**Top rushers**

- SDG – Gary Garrison – 1 rush, 20 yards
- DEN – Jon Keyworth – 20 rushes, 132 yards

**Top receivers**

- SDG – Dwight McDonald – 2 receptions, 31 yards
- DEN – Floyd Little – 1 reception, 14 yards
  DEN – Boyd Brown – 1 reception, 14 yards

Despite a minimal contribution from their offense, San Diego took the Broncos into overtime before losing to become the fourth NFL team to start a season 0–11. The Broncos drove 70 yards with the opening kickoff, scoring the only offensive touchdown of the game. Denver reached a 2nd and goal at the 8 on their next possession, but Fletcher intercepted a deflected Steve Ramsey pass in the end zone; Fletcher claimed a second interception on the next Broncos drive. The Chargers' offense was unable to convert these turnovers into any points, but their special teams got them on the scoreboard soon afterwards, Fuller finding space down the left sideline on a punt return, then cutting inside to complete a 42-yard touchdown. Fletcher intercepted Ramsey again three plays later; San Diego could only move the ball nine yards on three plays, but Wersching kicked a 34-yard field goal to take the lead at 10–7. Neither side crossed midfield in the remaining 7:41 of the first half. The Chargers led at halftime despite managing only 25 yards and failing to register a single first down in six possessions (Denver had 155 yards and 12 first downs).

Denver switched quarterbacks for the second half, with John Hufnagel leading a game-tying field goal drive on his first drive. He also moved his team into Chargers territory on his next possession, but was intercepted by Fuller. Shortly afterwards, Garrison gained 20 yards on a double reverse, picking up a first down—it was the Chargers' first of the game and occurred on their ninth possession, after over 41 minutes of game time. They were forced to punt after three further plays. Floyd Rice had the Chargers' fifth interception soon afterwards. McDonald's 22-yard catch moved them into Denver territory, but they soon punted again. Late in regulation, Colbert intercepted Hufnagel, but Freitas was soon intercepted in turn; the quarterback made a tackle at his own 15-yard line. After two running plays, Broncos kicker Jim Turner came on for a 23-yard field goal, but Colbert blocked the attempt as time expired. Denver, however, won the overtime coin toss and moved into Charger territory when Fletcher was flagged for a 43-yard pass interference penalty. Soon afterwards, Turner won the game with a 25-yard field goal.

San Diego were outgained by 336 yards to 123. Denver picked up 24 first downs to the Chargers' 3; this remains the fewest they have gained in a game. Freitas failed to complete any of his final twelve passes—overall, he completed 8 of 24 passes for 72 yards and an interception, while the two Denver quarterbacks passed for 20 and 26 yards respectively and threw three interceptions each. The Broncos rushed for 328 yards, a new record for an opponent of the Chargers. San Diego became the first team in thirteen years to lose while intercepting at least six opposition passes. Fletcher's three interceptions gave him more catches than any offensive player from either team.

==== Week 12: at Kansas City Chiefs ====
Week Twelve: San Diego Chargers at Kansas City Chiefs – Game summary

Quarter	1	2	3	4	Total
**Chargers**	7	0	7	14	**28**
Chiefs	3	3	14	0	**20**

at Arrowhead Stadium, Kansas City, Missouri

- Date: December 7
- Game time: 1:00 p.m. CST
- Game weather: 33 °F (0.6 °C), relative humidity 59%, wind 8 mph, wind chill 25
- Game attendance: 46,888
- Referee: Fred Silva
- TV announcers (NBC): Charlie Jones and Sam DeLuca
- Box score

Game information

**First quarter**

- SDG – Rickey Young 5-yard run (Ray Wersching kick), 13:59. Chargers 7–0. **Drive: 3 plays, 24 yards.**
- KAN – Jan Stenerud 21-yard field goal, 7:55. Chargers 7–3. **Drive: 9 plays, 43 yards, 4:36.**

**Second quarter**

- KAN – Jan Stenerud 22-yard field goal, 9:52. Chargers 7–6. **Drive: 8 plays, 58 yards, 4:48.**

**Third quarter**

- SDG – Sam Scarber 8-yard run (Ray Wersching kick), 11:15. Chargers 14–6. **Drive: 8 plays, 66 yards, 3:45.**
- KAN – Woody Green 1-yard run (Jan Stenerud kick), 5:37. Chargers 14–13. **Drive: 4 plays, 16 yards, 1:37.**
- KAN – Barry Pearson 17-yard pass from Len Dawson (Jan Stenerud kick), 3:42. Chiefs 20–14. **Drive: 3 plays, 16 yards, 0:16.**

**Fourth quarter**

- SDG – Rickey Young 3-yard run (Ray Wersching kick), 14:02. Chargers 21–20. **Drive: 9 plays, 68 yards, 4:40.**
- SDG – Dan Fouts 9-yard run (Ray Wersching kick), 7:58. Chargers 28–20. **Drive: 7 plays, 46 yards, 4:01.**

**Top passers**

- SDG – Dan Fouts – 8/18, 168 yards, 3 INT
- KAN – Len Dawson – 14/20, 154 yards, TD

**Top rushers**

- SDG – Rickey Young – 25 rushes, 124 yards, 2 TD
- KAN – Woody Green – 11 rushes, 32 yards, TD

**Top receivers**

- SDG – Pat Curran – 3 receptions, 95 yards
- KAN – Barry Pearson – 3 receptions, 61 yards, TD

The Chargers avoided a winless season with victory in Kansas City. They had an excellent start, with Floyd Rice recovering a fumble on the opening kickoff; Young scored from the 5-yard line only three plays later. Fouts, back after injury, was intercepted near midfield on the next possession, setting up a short Chiefs field goal. Dean recovered a fumble on the following Kansas City drive, and a 23-yard Garrison catch helped the Chargers reach a 1st and 10 at the 12, but Matthews then fumbled the ball back to the Chiefs. Kansas City drove the other way for another close-range field goal, and San Diego led only 7–6 at halftime when Wersching missed a 30-yarder wide left, squandering a chance created by Curran's 39-yard catch.

On the first possession of the second half, Curran caught a 28-yard pass to move the Chargers into opposition territory, and Scarber ran through the right guard area to score from 8 yards out. Fouts, however, was intercepted on his next two pass attempts, setting up a pair of Chief touchdown drives of only 16 yards each. Down 20–14, Fouts came back with another 28-yard completion to Curran, and Young scored his second touchdown on 3rd and 1 from the 3, completing a 68-yard touchdown drive. After forcing a punt, the Chargers benefitted from a personal foul penalty, and started their next drive at the Kansas City 46. Their next seven plays were all runs, the last of these a third down 9-yard Fouts scramble up the middle for a touchdown. The Chiefs had three more possessions, ending in a punt, Bacon's 4th-down sack, and time expiring.

San Diego gained a season-high 412 yards while giving up a season-low 232. Curran had 3 catches for 95 yards, while Young rushed 25 times for 124 yards and two touchdowns.

==== Week 13: vs. New York Jets ====
Week Thirteen: New York Jets at San Diego Chargers – Game summary

Quarter	1	2	3	4	Total
Jets	0	3	7	6	**16**
**Chargers**	7	7	0	10	**24**

at San Diego Stadium, San Diego, California

- Date: December 15
- Game time: 6:00 p.m. PST
- Game weather: 54 °F (12.2 °C), relative humidity 33%, wind 7 mph
- Game attendance: 49,706
- TV announcers (ABC): Frank Gifford, Alex Karras and Howard Cosell
- Box score

Game information

**First quarter**

- SDG – Tony Baker 4-yard run (Ray Wersching kick), 11:19. Chargers 7–0. **Drive: 8 plays, 68 yards, 3:41.**

**Second quarter**

- NYJ – Pat Leahy 20-yard field goal, 10:31. Chargers 7–3. **Drive: 15 plays, 68 yards, 8:11.**
- SDG – Rickey Young 2-yard run (Ray Wersching kick), 2:17. Chargers 14–3. **Drive: 9 plays, 76 yards, 4:16.**

**Third quarter**

- NYJ – Steve Davis 1-yard run (Pat Leahy kick), 7:25. Chargers 14–10. **Drive: 11 plays, 69 yards, 5:24.**

**Fourth quarter**

- SDG – Ray Wersching 45-yard field goal, 11:40. Chargers 17–10. **Drive: 5 plays, 18 yards, 1:52.**
- SDG – Bo Matthews 1-yard run (Ray Wersching kick), 2:33. Chargers 24–10. **Drive: 15 plays, 80 yards, 7:25.**
- NYJ – John Riggins 1-yard run (no conversion attempt), 0:00. Chargers 24–16. **Drive: 16 plays, 53 yards, 2:33.**

**Top passers**

- NYJ – Joe Namath – 15/29, 181 yards, 2 INT
- SDG – Dan Fouts – 6/11, 86 yards

**Top rushers**

- NYJ – John Riggins – 25 rushes, 75 yards, TD
- SDG – Rickey Young – 21 rushes, 111 yards, TD

**Top receivers**

- NYJ – Jerome Barkum – 6 receptions, 88 yards
- SDG – Pat Curran – 2 receptions, 51 yards

San Diego gained their second consecutive win after leading for most of the game against the Jets. The Chargers drove 68 yards in 8 plays with the opening kickoff, with Fouts scrambling for 20 yards on 3rd and 7, and finding Garrison for a 23-yard completion to the 4-yard line. Baker rushed for a touchdown on the next play. Partee later had a punt blocked, giving the Jets possession near midfield, but Chris Fletcher intercepted the ball, and returned it out of the end zone for 45 yards. San Diego moved into field goal range, but Wersching was short from 46 yards out. New York then drove to a 3rd and 1 at the Chargers 2-yard line, but Goode stopped John Riggins for the loss of a yard, forcing the Jets to settle for a short field goal. Later in the half, a Chargers drive was extended by penalty when a Jet ran into Partee after he had punted. That eventually led to Young's 2-yard touchdown run with 2:12 on the clock. Two Joe Namath completions swiftly moved New York into Chargers territory, before Fuller was charged with a 20-yard pass interference penalty, placing the ball at the 1-yard line. From there, the Jets rushed three times for no gain, before giving the ball to Riggins on fourth down—he was stopped by Goode and Kelcher for the loss of a yard, and San Diego maintained a 14–3 lead at halftime.

Mike Williams intercepted Namath on the first play of the second half, eventually leading to a Wersching field goal attempt that was short from 49 yards. Namath then completed all four of his pass for 54 yards on a 69-yard touchdown drive that pulled the Jets within four points. Freitas came in on the next drive, Fouts having been forced out of the game due to a concussion. Freitas passed only once as the Chargers moved from their own 26-yard line to a 4th and 1 from the New York 10. Young, who had converted from the same down and distance with a 12-yard carry four plays earlier, was stopped for no gain. The Jets drove into field goal range, but a bad snap prevented them from getting the kick away. Wersching made a 45-yard kick shortly afterwards, and Fletcher intercepted a deep Namath pass at his own 20 with ten minutes to play. It was Fletcher's sixth interception in the last four games. The Chargers then embarked on a 15-play, 80-yard drive that ran over seven minutes off the clock. Young had six carries for 59 yards, including a 22-yard run on 2nd and 17 on the second play. Freitas only completed one pass, an 18-yard connection with Curran on a 3rd and 16. Eventually, Matthews scored from a yard out to double the Chargers' lead. The Jets responded with a touchdown drive of their own, but it took them 16 plays to travel 53 yards, and time expired as Riggins scored. That prompted a field invasion, which led the officiating team to call an end to the match without New York attempting an extra point.

San Diego attempted only 16 passes but rushed 48 times for a season-high 249 yards and three touchdowns. Young led the team with 21 carries for 111 yards and a touchdown. This and the previous game would be the only 100-yard rushing performances of his career.

==== Week 14: at Cincinnati Bengals ====
Week Fourteen: San Diego Chargers at Cincinnati Bengals – Game summary

Quarter	1	2	3	4	Total
Chargers	0	10	7	0	**17**
**Bengals**	27	14	0	6	**47**

at Riverfront Stadium, Cincinnati, Ohio

- Date: December 21
- Game time: 1:00 p.m. EST
- Game weather: 28 °F (−2.2 °C), relative humidity 69%, wind 15 mph, wind chill 16
- Game attendance: 46,474
- Referee: Bob Frederic
- TV announcers (NBC): Charlie Jones and Sam DeLuca
- Box score

Game information

**First quarter**

- CIN – Ken Anderson 2-yard run (Dave Green kick), 9:52. Bengals 7–0. **Drive: 11 plays, 68 yards.**
- CIN – Stan Fritts 6-yard pass from Ken Anderson (Dave Green kick), 8:57. Bengals 14–0. **Drive: 2 plays, 11 yards.**
- CIN – Stan Fritts 1-yard run (kick blocked), 5:35. Bengals 20–0. **Drive: 9 plays, 32 yards.**
- CIN – Isaac Curtis 52-yard pass from Ken Anderson (Dave Green kick), 1:56. Bengals 27–0. **Drive: 5 plays, 74 yards.**

**Second quarter**

- CIN – Boobie Clark 1-yard run (Dave Green kick), 10:11. Bengals 34–0. **Drive: 9 plays, 56 yards.**
- SDG – Ray Wersching 43-yard field goal, 3:38. Bengals 34–3. **Drive: 13 plays, 46 yards.**
- SDG – Rickey Young 2-yard pass from Jesse Freitas (Ray Wersching kick), 1:55. Bengals 34–10. **Drive: 4 plays, 21 yards.**
- CIN – Lenvil Elliott 14-yard pass from Ken Anderson (Dave Green kick), 0:16. Bengals 41–10. **Drive: 8 plays, 70 yards.**

**Third quarter**

- SDG – Bo Matthews 3-yard run (Ray Wersching kick), 6:34. Bengals 41–17. **Drive: 5 plays, 18 yards.**

**Fourth quarter**

- CIN – John Reaves 1-yard run (kick failed), 12:37. Bengals 47–17. **Drive: 7 plays, 63 yards.**

**Top passers**

- SDG – Jesse Freitas – 11/27, 118 yards, TD
- CIN – Ken Anderson – 18/23, 216 yards, 3 TD

**Top rushers**

- SDG – Rickey Young – 16 rushes, 58 yards
- CIN – Stan Fritts – 16 rushes, 82 yards, TD

**Top receivers**

- SDG – Chuck Bradley – 1 reception, 42 yards
- CIN – Isaac Curtis – 3 receptions, 79 yards, TD

San Diego ended their season as it had begun, with a one-sided loss to an AFC Central team. The Bengals led 20–0 before San Diego's offense had even taken the field, scoring a touchdown on the game's opening possession and then adding two more after Young and Fuller both fumbled on kickoff returns. When the Charger offense got their chance, they opened with two three-and-out possessions, both of which Cincinnati answered with further touchdowns, running the score up to 34–0 with less than twenty minutes played.

Wersching kicked a 43-yard field goal, and Freitas found Young for a touchdown shortly after Billy Andrews recovered a fumble. The Bengals responded to the mini-comeback with Ken Anderson's third touchdown pass shortly before halftime. Anderson was rested for the second half, in which Rice and Mike Williams both recovered fumbles: the first led to a Matthews touchdown, but the offense went backwards after the second and Wersching missed a long field goal. A Bengals touchdown was the only score of the final quarter.

Williams had both an interception and a fumble recovery. The Chargers were outgained by 316 yards to 78 in the first half and 439–188 overall.

=== Standings ===
AFC West
	W	L	T	PCT	DIV	CONF	PF	PA	STK
^{(2)} Oakland Raiders	11	3	0	.786	5–1	8–3	375	255	W1
Denver Broncos	6	8	0	.429	3–3	4–7	254	307	L1
Kansas City Chiefs	5	9	0	.357	3–3	3–8	282	341	L4
San Diego Chargers	2	12	0	.143	1–5	2–9	189	345	L1

== Awards ==
Only one Charger was named to the 1976 Pro Bowl, with tackle Russ Washington a starter on the AFC squad; none were selected for the Associated Press All-Pro team. Kelcher did receive some votes for Defensive Rookie of the Year, finishing in fourth place.
