= Mike Fanning (American football) =

American football player (1953–2022)

No. 79, 74
- Position: Defensive tackle

Personal information
- Born: February 2, 1953; Mount Clemens, Michigan, U.S.
- Died: October 30, 2022 (aged 69)
- Listed height: 6 ft 6 in (1.98 m)
- Listed weight: 255 lb (116 kg)

Career information
- High school: Thomas Edison (OK)
- College: Notre Dame
- NFL draft: 1975: 1st round, 9th overall pick

Career history
- Los Angeles Rams (1975–1982); Detroit Lions (1983); Seattle Seahawks (1984)

Awards and highlights
- National champion (1973); First-team All-American (1974)

Career NFL statistics
- Sacks: 43.5
- Fumble recoveries: 4
- Safeties: 1
- Stats at Pro Football Reference

Michael LaVern Fanning (February 2, 1953 – October 30, 2022) was an American professional football player who was a defensive tackle for ten seasons in the National Football League (NFL). He played college football for the Notre Dame Fighting Irish, earning first-team All-American honors in 1974. He started in Super Bowl XIV for the Los Angeles Rams.

== College career ==
Fanning was born in Mount Clemens, Michigan. At the University of Notre Dame, he accounted for 164 tackles. He was a starter for the Fighting Irish at defensive tackle in 1973 and 1974, and was a 1974 first-team All-America selection by the Walter Camp Foundation, The Sporting News, Newspaper Enterprise Association, and Time. He was a second-team selection by the Associated Press. In his years at Notre Dame, he shared the practice field with Rudy Ruettiger, whose saga was made into a Hollywood film, Rudy.

Notre Dame ranked second in the nation in total defense in 1973 and the Irish claimed the national championship with an 11–0 record. In 1974, the defense ranked first in the nation, allowing only 195.2 yards per game and were ranked sixth in the nation in the final AP poll.

== Professional career ==
Fanning was selected in the first round with the ninth overall pick of the 1975 NFL draft by the Los Angeles Rams. He was touted to be the successor to Merlin Olsen, who was entering his 14th season in 1975. As a rookie, Fanning broke his leg, and saw limited action after returning midseason. In 1976, in spot duty for Olsen, he recorded four sacks.

Fanning took over as the starter at left tackle in 1979 after an injury to Cody Jones. Fanning had eight sacks in 1979 and ten sacks in 1980. He led the Rams in sacks in the strike-shortened 1982 season with five.

Prior to the 1983 season, Fanning was traded to the Detroit Lions. He played one season with the Lions and was signed as a free agent by the Seattle Seahawks in 1984. He had seven sacks in 1984 as a pass-rush specialist for the Seahawks.

== Later life ==
In 2009, Fanning joined the University of Tulsa athletic department, where he worked for 14 years. He initially worked with group ticket sales, before serving as the special assistant for administration and operations until his death.

Fanning died on October 30, 2022, at the age of 69.
