= Peter Demmerle =

American football player (1953–2007)

- Demmerle from the "Dome" (1975)

No. 85
- Position: Wide receiver

Personal information
- Born: September 6, 1953
- Died: May 24, 2007 (aged 53); Greenwich, Connecticut, U.S.

Career information
- High school: New Canaan (CT)
- College: University of Notre Dame

Career history
- 1972–1974: Notre Dame

Awards and highlights
- National champion (1973); Consensus All-American (1974)

Peter Kirk Demmerle (September 6, 1953 – May 24, 2007) was an American football player. He played college football at the University of Notre Dame as a wide receiver and was a consensus first-team All-American in 1974.

Demmerle was a member of the national championship team of 1973 which defeated top-ranked Alabama in the Sugar Bowl. A year earlier, he scored Notre Dame's only touchdown in the Orange Bowl; he was selected with the 320th overall pick in the thirteenth round of the 1975 NFL draft by the San Diego Chargers.

Demmerle graduated from Fordham University School of Law and worked in the insurance practice group at LeBoeuf, Lamb, Greene & MacRae. He died in 2007 at age 53, suffering from amyotrophic lateral sclerosis (ALS), better known as Lou Gehrig's disease, after an eight-year illness.
