= Ralph Perretta =

American football player (born 1953)

No. 61, 53, 59
- Positions: Center, guard

Personal information
- Born: January 30, 1953 (age 73); Rockville Centre, New York, U.S.
- Listed height: 6 ft 2 in (1.88 m)
- Listed weight: 252 lb (114 kg)

Career information
- High school: Holy Trinity (NY)
- College: Purdue
- NFL draft: 1975: 8th round, 206th overall pick

Career history
- San Diego Chargers (1975–1980); New York Giants (1980)

Awards and highlights
- First-team All-Big Ten (1974); Second-team All-Big Ten (1973)

Career NFL statistics
- Games played: 73
- Games started: 25
- Fumble recoveries: 2
- Stats at Pro Football Reference

Ralph Perretta (born January 30, 1953) is an American former professional football player who played offensive lineman for six seasons for the San Diego Chargers and New York Giants. He was an All State selection in high school while attending Holy Trinity on Long Island, NY. While at Purdue he was a 3-year starter and co captain for the Boilermakers. He was drafted in the eighth round with the 206th overall pick by the San Diego Chargers and started at center.
