= Drew Mahalic =

American football player (born 1953)

No. 53, 54
- Position: Linebacker

Personal information
- Born: May 22, 1953 (age 73); Albany, New York, U.S.
- Listed height: 6 ft 4 in (1.93 m)
- Listed weight: 225 lb (102 kg)

Career information
- High school: North (Farmington Hills, Michigan)
- College: Notre Dame (1971–1974)
- NFL draft: 1975: 3rd round, 69th overall pick

Career history
- Denver Broncos (1975)*; San Diego Chargers (1975); Philadelphia Eagles (1976–1978)
- * Offseason or practice squad member only

Awards and highlights
- National champion (1973)

Career NFL statistics
- Sacks: 3
- Fumble recoveries: 5
- Interceptions: 2
- Stats at Pro Football Reference

Drew Alan Mahalic (born May 22, 1953) is an American former professional football player who was a linebacker for four seasons in the National Football League (NFL) with the San Diego Chargers and Philadelphia Eagles. He was selected by the Denver Broncos in the third round of the 1975 NFL draft after playing college football for the Notre Dame Fighting Irish.

== Early life and college ==
Drew Alan Mahalic was born on May 22, 1953, in Albany, New York. He attended North Farmington High School in Farmington Hills, Michigan.

Mahalic was a member of the Notre Dame Fighting Irish of the University of Notre Dame from 1971 to 1974. The 1973 Fighting Irish were AP Poll national champions. He played in the Coaches All-America Game after his senior year.

== Professional career ==
Mahalic was selected by the Denver Broncos in the third round, with the 69th overall pick, of the 1975 NFL draft. On September 17, 1975, he was waived by the Broncos before the start of the 1975 season and claimed by the San Diego Chargers the same day. He played in 13 games, starting one, for the Chargers in 1975, recording one interception and one fumble recovery.

On July 20, 1976, the Chargers sold Mahalic to the Philadelphia Eagles for an undisclosed cash sum. He appeared in 13 games for the Eagles during the 1976 season, recovering three fumbles. He played in 14 games, starting nine, in 1977, totaling three sacks and one fumble recovery. Mahalic appeared in nine games, all starts, for the Eagles in 1978, recording one interception. He missed playing time that season due to severe allergies and hip problems. He was cut on August 21, 1979, after suffering a knee injury.

== Personal life ==
Mahalic later received his J.D. degree from Harvard Law School.
